= Endonuclease/Exonuclease/phosphatase family =

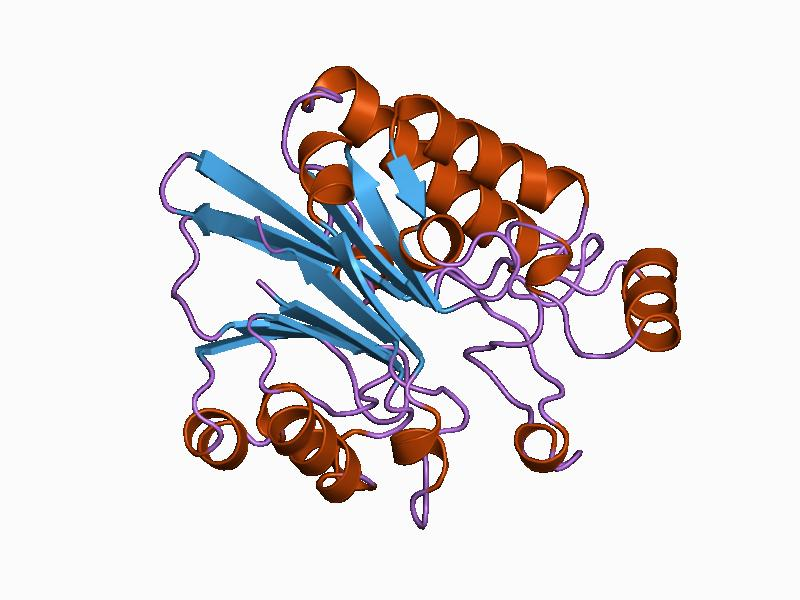
- Structure of the multifunctional DNA-repair enzyme exonuclease III.

Identifiers
- Symbol: Exo_endo_phos
- Pfam: PF03372
- InterPro: IPR005135
- PROSITE: PDOC00598
- SCOP2: 1ako / SCOPe / SUPFAM
- OPM superfamily: 139
- OPM protein: 1zwx
- CDD: cd08372
Available protein structures:
- PDB: IPR005135 PF03372 (ECOD; PDBsum)
- AlphaFold: IPR005135; PF03372

Endonuclease/Exonuclease/phosphatase family is a structural domain found in the large family of proteins including magnesium dependent endonucleases and many phosphatases involved in intracellular signaling.

== Examples ==
- AP endonuclease proteins EC 4.2.99.18,
- DNase I proteins EC 3.1.21.1,
- Synaptojanin, an inositol-1,4,5-trisphosphate phosphatase EC 3.1.3.56
- Sphingomyelinase EC 3.1.4.12
- Nocturnin, an NADPH 2' phosphatase

== Subfamilies ==
- Inositol polyphosphate related phosphatase InterPro: IPR000300

== Human proteins containing this domain ==
2'-PDE; 2-PDE; ANGEL1; ANGEL2; APEX1; APEX2; CCRN4L; CNOT6; CNOT6L; DNASE1; DNASE1L1; DNASE1L2; DNASE1L3; INPP5A; INPP5B; INPP5D; INPP5E; INPPL1; KIAA1706; OCRL; PIB5PA; SKIP; SMPD2; SMPD3; SYNJ1; SYNJ2; TTRAP; Nocturnin;
