= Esterase =

Class of enzymes which split esters into an acid and alcohol via hydrolysis

In biochemistry, an esterase is a class of enzyme that splits esters into an acid and an alcohol in a chemical reaction with water called hydrolysis (and as such, it is a type of hydrolase).

A wide range of different esterases exist that differ in their substrate specificity, their protein structure, and their biological function.

== EC classification/list of enzymes ==
- EC 3.1.1: Carboxylic ester hydrolases
  - Acetylesterase (EC 3.1.1.6), splits off acetyl groups
    - Cholinesterase
      - Acetylcholinesterase, inactivates the neurotransmitter acetylcholine
      - Pseudocholinesterase, broad substrate specificity, found in the blood plasma and in the liver
  - Pectinesterase (EC 3.1.1.11), clarifies fruit juices
- EC 3.1.2: Thiolester hydrolases
  - Thioesterase
    - Ubiquitin carboxy-terminal hydrolase L1
- EC 3.1.3: Phosphoric monoester hydrolases
  - Phosphatase (EC 3.1.3.x), hydrolyses phosphoric acid monoesters into a phosphate ion and an alcohol
    - Alkaline phosphatase, removes phosphate groups from many types of molecules, including nucleotides, proteins, and alkaloids.
    - Phosphodiesterase (PDE), inactivates the second messenger cAMP
      - cGMP specific phosphodiesterase type 5, is inhibited by Sildenafil (Viagra)
  - Fructose bisphosphatase (3.1.3.11), converts fructose-1,6-bisphosphate to fructose-6-phosphate in gluconeogenesis
- EC 3.1.4: Phosphoric diester hydrolases
- EC 3.1.5: Triphosphoric monoester hydrolases
- EC 3.1.6: Sulfuric ester hydrolases (sulfatases)
- EC 3.1.7: Diphosphoric monoester hydrolases
- EC 3.1.8: Phosphoric triester hydrolases
- Exonucleases (deoxyribonucleases and ribonucleases)
  - EC 3.1.11: Exodeoxyribonucleases producing 5'-phosphomonoesters
  - EC 3.1.13: Exoribonucleases producing 5'-phosphomonoesters
  - EC 3.1.14: Exoribonucleases producing 3'-phosphomonoesters
  - EC 3.1.15: Exonucleases active with either ribo- or deoxy-
- Endonucleases (deoxyribonucleases and ribonucleases)
  - Endodeoxyribonuclease
  - Endoribonuclease
  - either deoxy- or ribo-

== See also ==
- Enzyme
- List of enzymes
- Carboxylic acid
- Ester
- Leukocyte esterase
- Hemagglutinin esterase
- Nuclease
- Lipase
- Asymmetric ester hydrolysis with pig-liver esterase
