= Nocturnin =

Protein-coding gene in the species Homo sapiens

NOCT
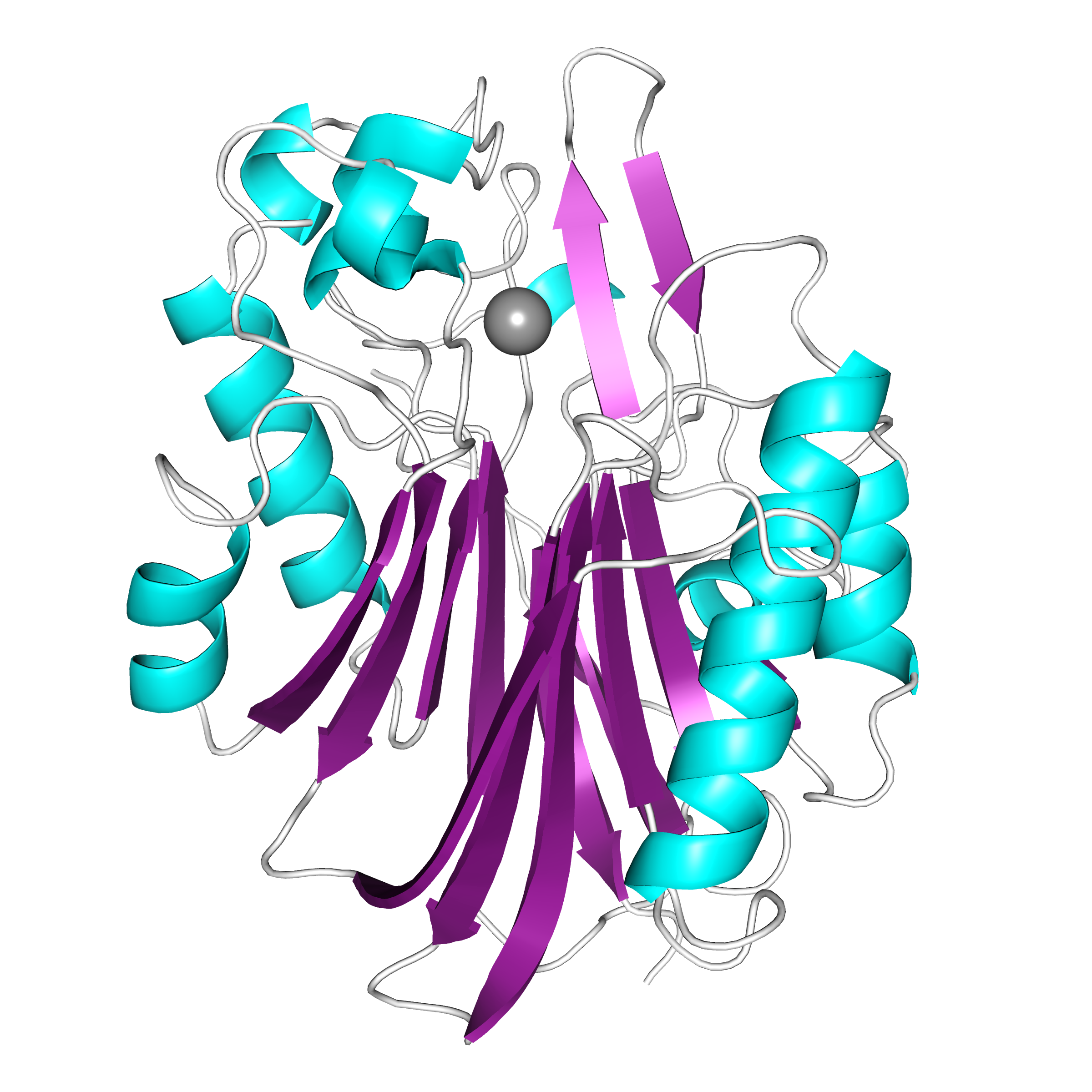
- A cartoon representation of human apo-Nocturnin coordinating a magnesium (grey sphere). Colored purple and cyan are the beta sheets and alpha helices of Nocturnin, respectively. The cartoon is from the deposited structure 6MAL in the Protein Data Bank.

Identifiers
- Aliases: NOCT, CCR4L, Ccr4c, NOC, CCRN4L, nocturnin
- External IDs: OMIM: 608468; MGI: 109382; GeneCards: NOCT
Available structures
PDB	Ortholog search: PDBe RCSB
PDB	List of PDB id codes 6MAL
Enzyme activity
EC #	BRENDA	ExPASy	KEGG	MetaCyc
3.1.3.108	↗	↗	↗	↗

Gene location (Human)
Chr.	Chromosome 4 (human)
Band	4q31.1	Start	139,015,781 bp
Band	4q31.1	End	139,045,939 bp

Gene location (Mouse)
Chr.	Chromosome 3 (mouse)
Band	3|3 C	Start	51,131,868 bp
Band	3|3 C	End	51,159,065 bp
RNA expression pattern
Bgee	Human / Mouse (ortholog); Top expressed in: buccal mucosa cell; muscle of thigh; islet of Langerhans; gonad; testicle; stromal cell of endometrium; pancreatic ductal cell; gallbladder; gastrocnemius muscle; secondary oocyte / Top expressed in: secondary oocyte; primary oocyte; zygote; lacrimal gland; plantaris muscle; myocardium of ventricle; piriform cortex; temporal lobe; extensor digitorum longus muscle; ureter; More reference expression data
BioGPS	n/a
Gene ontology
Molecular function	DNA-binding transcription factor activity; metal ion binding; RNA binding; nuclease activity; exonuclease activity; hydrolase activity; poly(A)-specific ribonuclease activity; mRNA binding; 3'-5'-exoribonuclease activity
Cellular component	P-body; nucleoplasm; cytoplasm; perinuclear region of cytoplasm; nucleus; CCR4-NOT complex
Biological process	regulation of embryonic development; RNA phosphodiester bond hydrolysis, exonucleolytic; rhythmic process; deadenylation-dependent decapping of nuclear-transcribed mRNA; mRNA processing; transcription by RNA polymerase II; P-body assembly; response to extracellular stimulus; response to lipopolysaccharide; regulation of transcription, DNA-templated; circadian rhythm; regulation of circadian rhythm; negative regulation of osteoblast differentiation; mRNA stabilization; negative regulation of gene expression; positive regulation of fat cell differentiation; circadian regulation of gene expression; nucleic acid phosphodiester bond hydrolysis; nuclear-transcribed mRNA poly(A) tail shortening
Sources:Amigo / QuickGO
Orthologs
Databases	NCBI: entry; OMA: entry
Species	Human	Mouse
Entrez	25819	12457
Ensembl	ENSG00000151014	ENSMUSG00000023087
UniProt	Q9UK39	O35710
RefSeq (mRNA)	NM_012118	NM_009834
RefSeq (protein)	NP_036250	NP_033964
Location (UCSC)	Chr 4: 139.02 – 139.05 Mb	Chr 3: 51.13 – 51.16 Mb
PubMed search
- Wikidata
View/Edit Human	View/Edit Mouse

Nocturnin is a human hydrolase enzyme that is involved in metabolism and its expression is controlled by the rhythmic circadian clock. It is encoded by the NOCT gene located on chromosome 4. Nocturnin contains a C-terminal structural domain of the Endonuclease/Exonuclease/phosphatase family. A study in January 2019, demonstrated that NADP+ and NADPH are the direct targets of Nocturnin.

The Drosophila melanogaster ortholog of Nocturnin is Curled. Knockouts of Curled lead to the curled wing phenotype in fruit flies. The curled wing phenotype was first discovered by Thomas Hunt Morgan in 1915. In mice the Nocturnin ortholog is responsible for controlling diet and weight-gain, knockout mice do not gain weight when placed on a high-fat diet, when compared to normal mice containing Nocturnin. In mice it has also been shown that Nocturnin is rhythmically expressed even when mice are placed in complete darkness, demonstrating that Nocturnin expression is driven by our body's internal clock.

== Cellular localization ==
Nocturnin was shown to have a Mitochondrial targeting sequence, which is located on the N-terminus of the protein. The targeting sequence of Nocturnin is cleaved off at the mitochondria to allow entry.

== Enzymatic activity ==
Nocturnin was previously thought to deadenylate mRNAs of metabolic genes, but two studies in 2018 found that Nocturnin does not directly possess ribonuclease activity. A study in January 2019 demonstrated that human Nocturnin is a phosphatase that acts directly on NADP(H) to remove the 2' phosphate. Curled, the Drosophila ortholog, was also shown to be an NADP(H) 2' phosphatase, which indicates that the enzymatic activity is conserved from humans to fruit flies.

== Structure ==
Nocturnin contains a C-terminal structural domain of the Endonuclease/Exonuclease/phosphatase family (EEP). Its protein fold is similar to that of DNase I, AP endonuclease, INPP5B, Sphingomyelin phosphodiesterase, TDP2, PDE12, and CNOT6L. As in the other EEP members, five conserved catalytic residues help coordinate a Magnesium atom, for Nocturnin the divalent metal participates in the NADP(H) phosphatase activity. The first structures of human Nocturnin were solved in 2017-2018 (6BT1, 6BT2, and 6MAL). All three were of the C-terminal EEP-like domain of Nocturnin bound to its cofactor magnesium. In December 2018, the first structure of Nocturnin bound to its natural substrate, NADPH, was determined, 6NF0.
