= Hypersensitive site =

Region of DNA with increased binding of transcription factors and nucleases

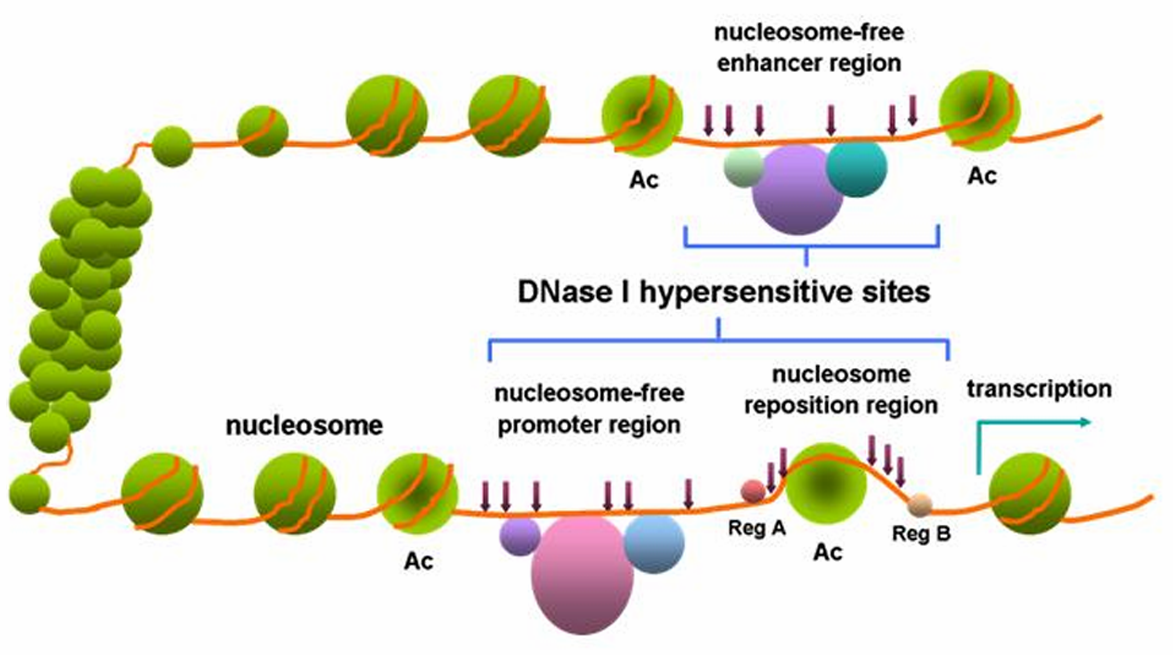
DNase I hypersensitive sites within chromatin

In genetics, a hypersensitive site is a short region of chromatin and is detected by its super sensitivity to cleavage by DNase I and other various nucleases (DNase II and micrococcal nucleases). In a hypersensitive site, the nucleosomal structure is less compacted, increasing the availability of the DNA to binding by proteins, such as transcription factors and DNase I. These sites play an important role in the regulation of gene expression by increasing DNA accessibility to transcription factors. DNase I hypersensitive sites (DHSs) are widely recognized as markers of open chromatin and are closely associated with regulatory regions of the genome involved in gene transcription.

== Location ==
Hypersensitive sites are found on every active gene, and many of these genes often have more than one hypersensitive site. Most often, hypersensitive sites are found only in chromatin of cells in which the associated gene is being expressed, and do not occur when the gene is inactive.

Genome-wide studies have shown that DNase I hypersensitive sites are frequently enriched at transcription start sites and other regulatory DNA elements, reflecting their role in controlling gene expression.

DNase hypersensitive sites are commonly associated with regions of open chromatin involved in transcription regulation and are frequently located near transcription start sites and other cis-regulation elements. Genome wide mapping studies have further demonstrated that these sites are enriched in regulatory DNA elements and reflect differences in chromatin accessibility associated with gene expression.

Hypersensitive sites are generated as a result of the binding of transcription factors that displace histone octamers.

They can also be located by indirect end labelling. A fragment of DNA is cut once at the hypersensitive site with DNase and at another site with a restriction enzyme. The distance from the known restriction site to the DNase cut is then measured to give the location.
