= Synaptojanin =

Protein involved in vesicle uncoating in neurons

synaptojanin 1

Identifiers
- Symbol: SYNJ1
- NCBI gene: 8867
- HGNC: 11503
- OMIM: 604297
- RefSeq: NM_003895
- UniProt: O43426

Other data
- Locus: Chr. 21 q22.2
Search for
- Structures: Swiss-model
- Domains: InterPro

synaptojanin 2

Identifiers
- Symbol: SYNJ2
- NCBI gene: 8871
- HGNC: 11504
- OMIM: 609410
- RefSeq: NM_003898
- UniProt: O15056

Other data
- Locus: Chr. 6 q25.3
Search for
- Structures: Swiss-model
- Domains: InterPro

Synaptojanin is a protein involved in vesicle uncoating in neurons. This is an important regulatory lipid phosphatase. It dephosphorylates the D-5 position phosphate from phosphatidylinositol (3,4,5)-trisphosphate (PIP_{3}) and phosphatidylinositol (4,5)-bisphosphate (PIP_{2}). It belongs to family of 5-phosphatases, which are structurally unrelated to D-3 inositol phosphatases like PTEN. Other members of the family of 5'phosphoinositide phosphatases include OCRL, SHIP1, SHIP2, INPP5J, INPP5E, INPP5B, INPP5A and SKIP.

== Synaptojanin family ==
The synaptojanin family comprises proteins that are key players in the synaptic vesicle recovery at the synapse. In general, vesicles containing neurotransmitters fuse with the presynaptic cell in order to release neurotransmitter into the synaptic cleft. It is the release of neurotransmitters that allows neuron to neuron communication in the nervous system. The recovery of the vesicle is referred to as endocytosis and is important to reset the presynaptic cell with new neurotransmitter.

Synaptojanin 1 and Synaptojanin 2 are the two main proteins in the synaptojanin family. Synaptojanin 2 can be further subdivided into synaptojanin 2a and synaptojanin 2b.

The mechanism by which vesicles are recovered is thought to involve the synaptojanin attracting the protein clathrin, which coats the vesicle and initiates vesicle endocytosis.

Synaptojanins are composed to three domains. The first is a central inositol 5-phosphatase domain, which can act on both PIP_{2} and PIP_{3}. The second is an N-terminal Sac1-like inositol phosphatase domain, which, in vitro, can hydrolyze PIP and PIP_{2} to PI. The third is a C-terminal domain that is rich in the amino acid proline and interacts with several proteins also involved in vesicle endocytosis. Specifically, the c-terminal domain interacts with amphiphysin, endophilin, DAP160/intersectin, syndapin and Eps15. The function of endophilin appears to be a binding partner for synaptojanin such that it can interact with other proteins and is involved in the initiation of shallow clathrin coated pits. Dap160 is a molecular scaffolding protein and functions in actin recruitment. Dynamin is a GTPase involved in vesicle budding, specifically modulating the severance of the vesicle from the neuronal membrane. Dynamin appears to be playing a larger role in neurite formation because its vesicle pinching role and the possibility of it recycling plasma membrane and growth factor receptor proteins.

Mutations in Synaptojanin 1 have been associated with autosomal recessive, early-onset parkinsonism.

== Role in development ==
Synaptojanin, through its interactions with a variety of proteins and molecules is thought to play a role in the development of nervous systems.

=== Ephrin ===
Synaptojanin 1 has been found to be influenced by the protein ephrin. Ephrin is a chemorepellent meaning that its interactions with proteins results in an inactivation or retraction of processes when referring to neuronal migration. Ephrin's receptor is called Eph and is a receptor tyrosine kinase. Upon activation of the Eph receptor, synaptojanin 1 becomes phosphorylated at the proline rich domain and is inhibited from binding with any of its natural binding partners. Therefore, the presence of ephrin inactivates vesicle endocytosis.

=== Calcium ===
The influx of calcium in the neuron has been shown to activate a variety of molecules including some calcium dependent phosphatases that activate synaptojanin.

=== Membranes ===
Neuronal migration during development involves the extension of a neurite along the extracellular matrix. This extension is guided by the growth cone. However the actual extension of the neurite involves the insertion of membrane lipids immediately behind the growth one. In fact, membranes can be trafficked from degenerating extensions to elongating ones. Synaptojanin has been proposed as the mechanism by which membrane lipids can be trafficked around the developing neuron.

=== Receptors ===
During development, receptors are trafficked around the growth cone. This trafficking involves vesicle endocytosis. In the presence of nerve growth factor (NGF), TrkA receptors are trafficked to the stimulated side of the growth cone. Additionally, calcium and glutamate stimulate the trafficking of AMPA receptors to the stimulated side of the growth cone. Both of these receptors are trafficked via synaptojanin.
