= Phosphomonoesterase =

Phosphomonoesterase may refer to:

- Phosphoric monoester hydrolases, an enzyme
- Acid phosphatase, an enzyme
