= Deoxyribonuclease II, lysosomal =

Protein-coding gene in the species Homo sapiens

DNASE2

Identifiers
- Aliases: DNASE2, DNASE2A, DNL, DNL2, deoxyribonuclease II, lysosomal, deoxyribonuclease 2, lysosomal, AIPCS
- External IDs: OMIM: 126350; MGI: 1329019; GeneCards: DNASE2
Enzyme activity
EC #	BRENDA	ExPASy	KEGG	MetaCyc
3.1.22.1	↗	↗	↗	↗

Gene location (Human)
Chr.	Chromosome 19 (human)
Band	19p13.13	Start	12,875,209 bp
Band	19p13.13	End	12,881,466 bp
RNA expression pattern
Bgee	Human / Mouse (ortholog); Top expressed in: pancreatic ductal cell; stromal cell of endometrium; external globus pallidus; parotid gland; Descending thoracic aorta; cardia; monocyte; vena cava; lateral nuclear group of thalamus; pars compacta / n/a; More reference expression data
BioGPS	n/a
Gene ontology
Molecular function	DNA binding; nuclease activity; endonuclease activity; endodeoxyribonuclease activity; hydrolase activity; deoxyribonuclease II activity
Cellular component	lysosome; extracellular exosome; intracellular anatomical structure
Biological process	erythrocyte differentiation; multicellular organism development; DNA metabolic process; DNA catabolic process; DNA catabolic process, endonucleolytic; apoptotic process; apoptotic DNA fragmentation; regulation of immune response
Sources:Amigo / QuickGO
Orthologs
Databases	NCBI: entry; OMA: entry
Species	Human	Mouse
Entrez	1777	13423
Ensembl	ENSG00000105612	ENSMUSG00000003812
UniProt	O00115	P56542
RefSeq (mRNA)	NM_001375	NM_010062; NM_001368295; NM_001368296
RefSeq (protein)	NP_001366; NP_001366.1	NP_034192; NP_001355224; NP_001355225
Location (UCSC)	Chr 19: 12.88 – 12.88 Mb	n/a
PubMed search
- Wikidata
View/Edit Human	View/Edit Mouse

Deoxyribonuclease II, lysosomal is a protein that in humans is encoded by the DNASE2 gene.

== Function ==
This gene encodes a member of the DNase family. The protein, located in the lysosome, hydrolyzes DNA under acidic conditions and mediates the breakdown of DNA during erythropoiesis and apoptosis.

Two codominant alleles have been characterized, DNASE2*L (low activity) and DNASE2*H (high activity), that differ at one nucleotide in the promoter region. The DNASE2*H allele is represented in this record.
