= Phosphomonoester =

Phosphomonoesters (or phosphoric esters) are chemical compounds containing one ester bond and a phosphate group.

In biology, phosphomonoesters are needed as the building blocks for the synthesis of Phospholipid cellular membranes, especially those found on neurons. Enzymes which cleave these bonds are known as phosphomonoesterases, or phosphatases.

== See also ==
- Phosphoric acid
- Phospholipid
