= Deoxyribonuclease II =

Endonuclease

deoxyribonuclease II alpha

Identifiers
- Symbol: DNASE2
- Alt. symbols: DNASE2A, DRN2, DNL, DNL2
- NCBI gene: 1777
- HGNC: 2960
- OMIM: 126350
- RefSeq: NM_001375
- UniProt: O00115

Other data
- EC number: 3.1.22.1
- Locus: Chr. 19 p13.2
Search for
- Structures: Swiss-model
- Domains: InterPro

deoxyribonuclease II beta

Identifiers
- Symbol: DNASE2B
- NCBI gene: 58511
- HGNC: 28875
- OMIM: 608057
- RefSeq: NM_021233
- UniProt: Q8WZ79

Other data
- EC number: 3.1.22.1
- Locus: Chr. 1 p22.3
Search for
- Structures: Swiss-model
- Domains: InterPro

Deoxyribonuclease II (EC 3.1.22.1, DNase II, pancreatic DNase II, deoxyribonucleate 3'-nucleotidohydrolase, pancreatic DNase II, acid deoxyribonuclease, acid DNase) is an endonuclease that hydrolyzes phosphodiester linkages of deoxyribonucleotide in native and denatured DNA, yielding products with 3'-phosphates and 5'-hydroxyl ends, which occurs as a result of single-strand cleaving mechanism. As the name implies, it functions optimally at acid pH because it is commonly found in low pH environment of lysosomes.

The action of DNase occurs in three phases. The initial phase introduces multiple nicks in the phosphodiester backbone. The second phase produces acid-soluble nucleotides. The third phase, which is the terminal phase, consists of hyperchromic shift resulting from reduction of oligonucleotides.

There are several known DNases II, including:

- DNase II alpha (usually known as DNase II), which is thought to be ubiquitously expressed in human tissue. It has been shown that a mutation in this enzyme of mice leads to DNA degradation by apoptosis.
- DNase II beta (also called DLAD, or DNase II-Like Acid DNase), which is mainly expressed in the eye lens and salivary glands. One of its functions is to clear DNA from eye lens. Low levels have also been detected in the lung, prostate and lymph nodes. Deficiency of this enzyme in mice lead to the development of cataracts.
