= Deoxyribonuclease =

Enzymes that break down DNA

Deoxyribonuclease (DNase, for short) is an enzyme that degrade DNA. It refers to a group of glycoprotein endonucleases, which catalyze the hydrolytic cleavage of phosphodiester linkages in the DNA backbone. The role of the DNase enzyme in cells includes breaking down extracellular DNA (eDNA) excreted by apoptosis, necrosis, and neutrophil extracellular traps (NET) of cells to help reduce inflammatory responses that otherwise are elicited. A wide variety of deoxyribonucleases are known and fall into one of two families (DNase I or DNase II), which differ in their substrate specificities, chemical mechanisms, and biological functions. Laboratory applications of DNase include purifying proteins when extracted from prokaryotic organisms. Additionally, DNase has been applied as a treatment for diseases that are caused by eDNA in the blood plasma. Assays of DNase are emerging in the research field as well.

== Types ==
The two main types of DNase found in animals are known as deoxyribonuclease I (DNase I) and deoxyribonuclease II (DNase II). These two families have subcategories within them.

=== DNase I ===
The first set of DNases is DNase I. This family consisted of DNase I, DNase1L1, DNase 1L2, and DNase1L3. DNase I cleaves DNA to form two oligonucleotide-end products with 5'-phospho and 3'-hydroxy ends and is produced mainly by organs of the digestive system. The DNase I family requires Ca^{2+} and Mg^{2+} cations as activators and selectively expressed. In terms of pH, the DNAses I family is active in normal pH of around 6.5 to 8.

=== DNase II ===
The second set of DNases is DNase II. This family consisted of DNase II α and DNase II β. Like DNase I, DNase II cleaves DNA to form two oligonucleotide-end products with 5'-hydroxy and 3'-phospho ends. This type of DNase is more widely expressed in tissues due to high expression in macrophages but limited cell-type expression. Unlike DNase I, they do not need Ca^{2+} and Mg^{2+} cations as activators. In terms of pH, the DNase II family is expressed in acidic pH. The cleavage pattern of DNase II is altered in the presence of Dimethyl sulfoxide(DMSO), which significantly affects the structure of DNA.

== Structure ==
Although both DNase I and II are glycoprotein endonucleases, DNase I has a monomeric sandwich-type structure with a carbohydrate side chain whereas DNase II has a dimeric quaternary structure.

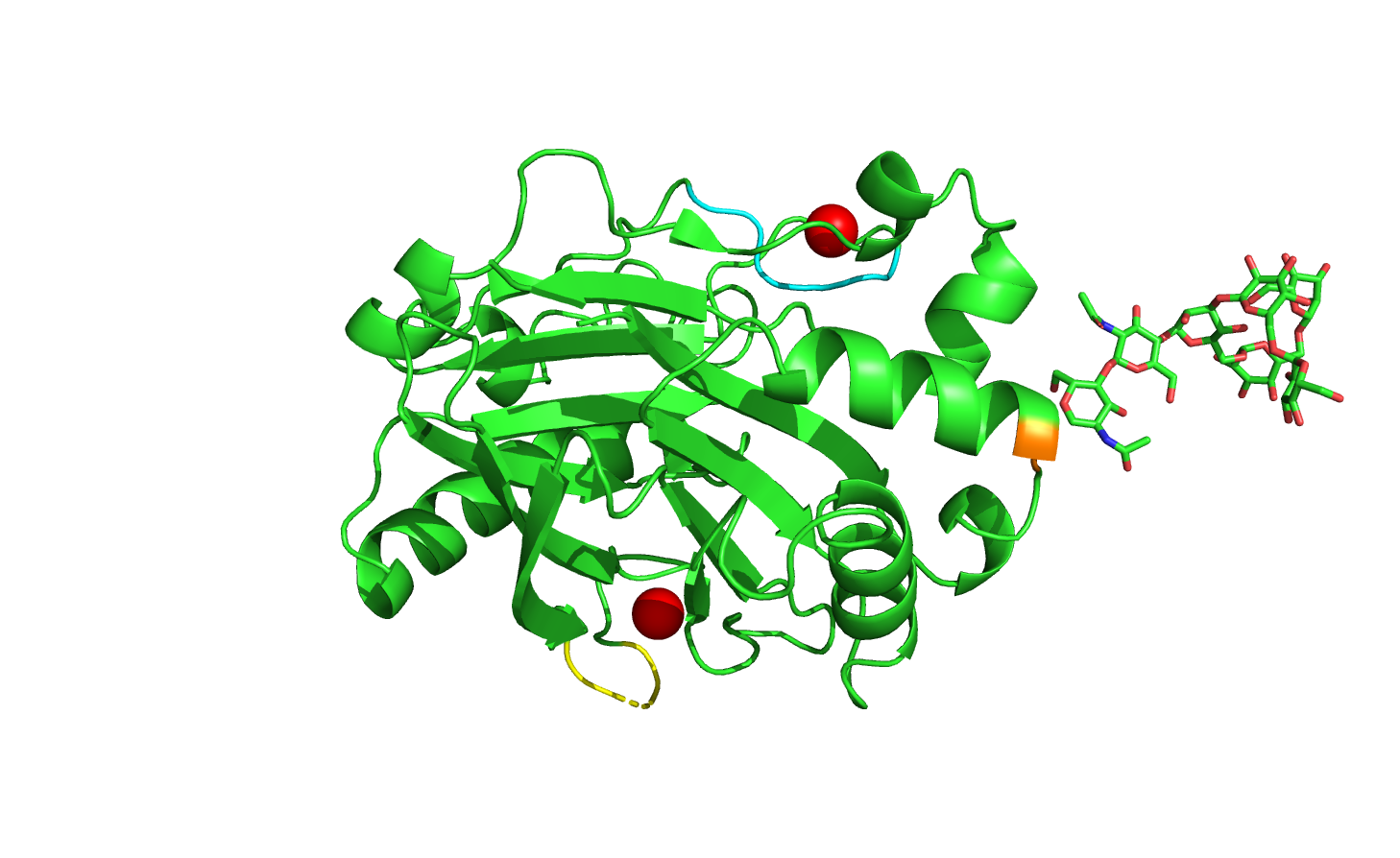
Glycoprotein DNase I 3D structure PDB: 3DNI

DNase I is a glycoprotein with a molecular weight of 30,000 Da and a carbohydrate chain of 8-10 residues attached to Asn18 (orange). It is an 𝛼,𝛽-protein with two 6-stranded 𝛽-pleated sheets, which form the core of the structure. These two core sheets run parallel, and all others run antiparallel. The 𝛽-pleated sheets lie in the center of the structure while the 𝛼-helices are denoted by the coils on the periphery. DNase I contains four ion-binding pockets, and requires Ca^{2+} and Mg^{2+} for hydrolyzing double-stranded DNA. Two of the sites strongly bind Ca^{2+} while the other two coordinate Mg^{2+}. Little has been published on the number and location of the Mg^{2+} binding sites, although it has been proposed that Mg^{2+} is located near the catalytic pocket and contributes to hydrolysis. The two Ca^{2+} are shown in red in the image. They are bound to DNase I under crystallization conditions and are important for the structural integrity of the molecule by stabilizing the surface loop Asp198 to Thr204 (cyan), and by limiting the region of high thermal mobility in the flexible loop to residues Gly97 to Gly102 (yellow).

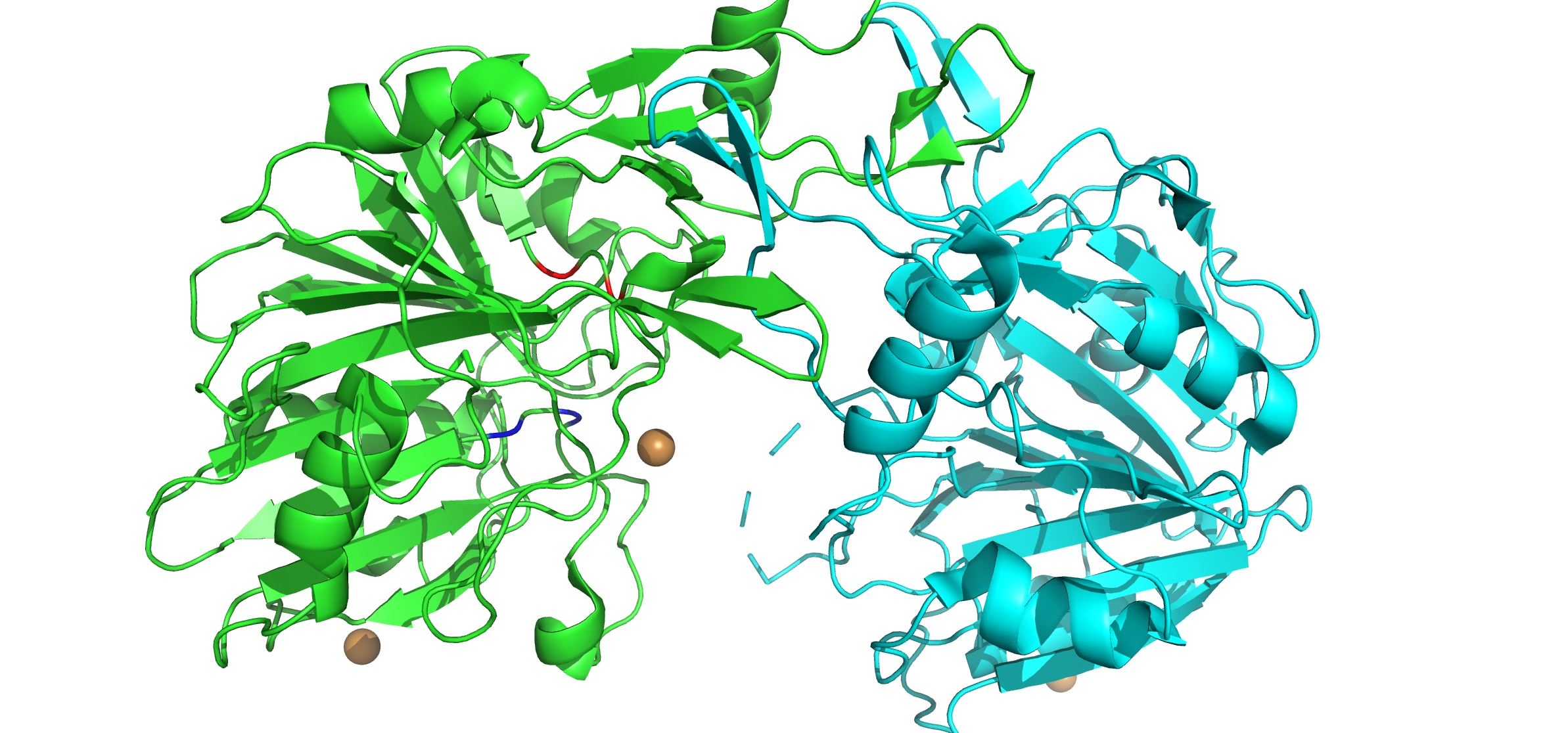
Glycoprotein DNase II 3D structure PDB: 5UNB

DNase II contains a homodimeric quaternary structure that is capable of binding double-stranded DNA within a U-shaped clamp architecture. The interior of the U-shaped clamp is largely electropositive, capable of binding negatively-charged DNA. Similar to DNase I, DNase II structure consists of a mixed 𝛼/𝛽 secondary structure with 9 𝛼-helices and 20 𝛽-pleated sheets. Although unlike DNase I, DNase II does not require divalent metal ions for catalysis. The structure consists of protomer A (cyan) and protomer B (green). Each structure consists of two catalytic motifs, which are labeled on protomer B for simplicity: His100 and Lys102 compose the first motif (blue) and His279 and Lys281 compose the second catalytic motif (red).

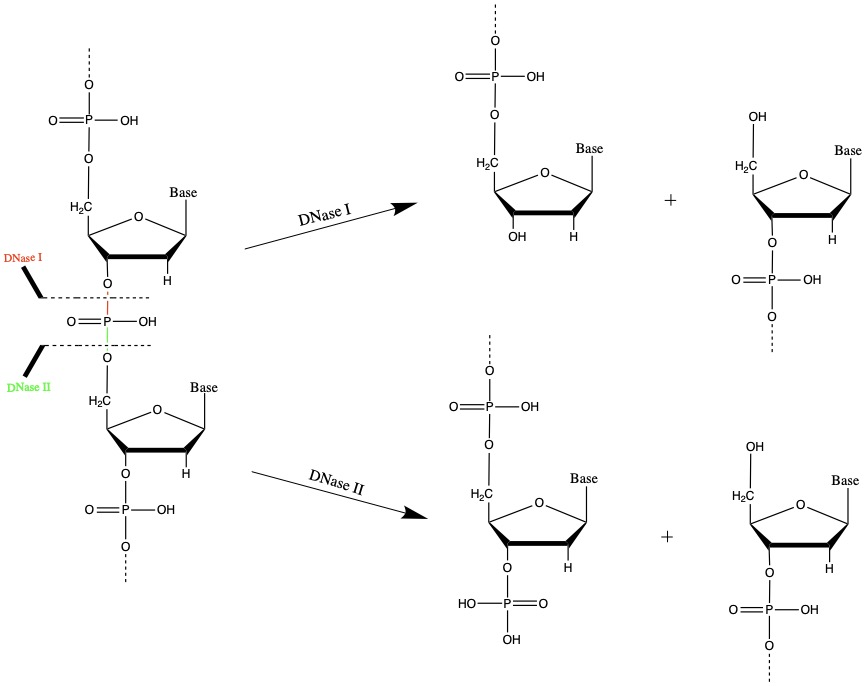
Mechanism of action for DNase enzymes

== Mechanism ==
Some DNases cut, or "cleave", only residues at the ends of DNA molecules. This type of exonuclease is known as exodeoxyribonucleases. Others cleave anywhere along the chain, known as endodeoxyribonucleases (a subset of endonucleases.) Some DNases are fairly indiscriminate about the DNA sequence at which they cut, while others, including restriction enzymes, are very sequence-specific. Other DNases cleave only double-stranded DNA, others are specific for single-stranded molecules, and others are active toward both.

The action of DNase occurs in three phases. The initial phase introduces multiple nicks in the phosphodiester backbone. The second phase produces acid-soluble nucleotides. The third phase, which is the terminal phase, consists of reduction of oligonucleotides, causing a hyperchromic shift in the UV data.

=== Mechanism of DNase I ===
DNase I predominantly targets double-stranded DNA, and to a lesser extent, some single-stranded DNA for cleavage. DNase I catalyzes nonspecific DNA cleavage by nicking phosphodiester linkages in one of the strands. Its cleavage site lies between the 3′-oxygen atom and the adjacent phosphorus atom, yielding 3′-hydroxyl and 5′-phosphoryl oligonucleotides with inversion of configuration at the phosphorus. The DNase enzyme relies on the presence of a divalent cation, which is usually Ca^{2+}, for proper function. The active site of DNase I includes two histidine residues (His134 and His252) and two acidic residues (Glu78 and Asp 212), all of which are critical for the general acid-base catalysis of phosphodiester bonds.

=== Mechanism of DNase II ===
Deoxyribonuclease II (DNase II) is also known as acid deoxyribonuclease because it has optimal activity in the low pH environment of lysosomes where it is typically found in higher eukaryotes. Some forms of recombinant DNase II display a high level of activity in low pH in the absence of divalent metal ions, similar to eukaryotic DNase II. Unlike DNase I, DNase II cleaves the phosphodiester bond between the 5'-oxygen atom and the adjacent phosphorus atom, yielding 3'-phosphorylated and 5'-hydroxyl nucleotides.

== Applications ==
=== Laboratory applications ===
DNase is commonly used when purifying proteins that are extracted from prokaryotic organisms. Protein extraction often involves the degradation of the cell membrane. It is common for the degraded and fragile cell membrane to be lysed, releasing unwanted DNA and the desired proteins. The resulting DNA-protein extract is highly viscous and difficult to purify, in which case DNase is added to break it down. The DNA is hydrolyzed but the proteins are unaffected and the extract can undergo further purification.

=== Medicine ===
Extracellular DNA (eDNA) is DNA that is found in blood circulation. It appears as a result of apoptosis, necrosis, or neutrophil extracellular traps (NET)-osis of blood and tissue cells, but can also arise from the active secretion from living cells. eDNA and their designated DNA binding proteins are able to activate DNA-sensing receptors, pattern recognition receptors (PRRs). PRRs are able to stimulate pathways that cause an inflammatory immune response. As a result, several studies of inflammatory diseases have found that there are high concentrations of eDNA in blood plasma. For this reason, DNase has proven to be a possible treatment for the reduction of eDNA in the blood plasma. DNases can be excreted both intracellularly and extracellularly and can cleave the DNA phosphodiester bond. This function can be used to maintain a low eDNA concentration, therefore treating inflammation. Illnesses that result from DNA residue in blood have been targeted using the "breaking-down properties" of DNase. Studies have shown DNase to be able to act as a treatment by decreasing the viscosity of mucus. Administration of DNase varies dependent on the disease. It can and has been administered orally, intrapleurally, intravenously, intraperitoneally, and via inhalation. Several studies continue to examine the application of DNase as treatment as well as ways to monitor health. For example, recently, DNase derived from pathogenic bacteria has been used as an indicator for wound infection monitoring.

==== Respiratory diseases ====
Cystic fibrosis is a genetic disorder that affects the production of mucus, sweat, and digestive fluids, causing them to become more viscous rather than lubricant. DNase enzymes can be inhaled using a nebulizer by cystic fibrosis sufferers. DNase enzymes help because white blood cells accumulate in the mucus, and, when they break down, they release DNA, which adds to the 'stickiness' of the mucus. DNase enzymes break down the DNA, and the mucus is much easier to clear from the lungs. Specifically, DNase I, also known as FDA approved drug Pulmozyme (also known as dornase alfa) is used as a treatment to increase pulmonary function.

Other respiratory illness such as asthma, pleural empyema, and chronic obstructive pulmonary disease have also been found to be positively affected by DNases properties.

Furthermore, recent studies show that intrapleural tissue plasminogen activator (tPA), a protein that is responsible for the breakdown of blood clots, combined with deoxyribonuclease increase pleural drainage, decreases hospital length of stay, and decreases the need for surgery in parapneumonic effusions and empyema.

==== Other diseases ====
Sepsis is a life-threatening inflammatory disease caused by the body's extreme response to an infection. The body begins to attack itself as an inflammatory response encompasses the human body. As a result, high levels of eDNA have been associated with the bloodstream and therefore, researchers have looked to DNase as an appropriate treatment. Studies have shown that DNase was successful in disrupting NETs and decreasing inflammatory responses. More research on the type and time of administration is needed to further establish DNase as an official treatment.

Systemic lupus erythematosus (SLE) is an autoimmune disease that results in auto-antibody generation causing inflammation that results in damage to organs, joints, and kidneys. SLE has been linked with low levels of DNase I as apoptotic cells become self-antigens in this disease. DNase I has been investigated as a possible treatment to decrease the amount of apoptotic debris in the human system. It has been suggested that their difficulty might be due to the inability for the enzyme to break down the cell membrane of chromatin. Studies have shown conflicting results on this treatment, however, further research is being conducted to examine the therapeutic benefits of DNase I.

DNase is known to hold anti-tumor effects due to its ability to break down DNA. High levels of DNA are found to be in cancer patients' blood, suggesting that DNase I might be a possible treatment. There is still a lack of understanding as to why there are such high levels of eDNA and whether or not DNase will act as an effective treatment. Several mice studies have shown positive results in anti-tumor progression utilizing intravenous DNase I. However, more investigations need to be carried out before being introduced to the public.

== Assays ==
DNA absorbs ultraviolet (UV) light with a wavelength of maximal absorbance near 260 nm. This absorption is due to the pi electrons in the aromatic bases of the DNA. In dsDNA, or even regions of RNA where double-stranded structure occurs, the bases are stacked parallel to each other, and the overlap of the base molecular orbitals leads to a decrease in absorbance of UV light. This phenomenon is called the hypochromic effect. When DNase liberates nucleotides from dsDNA, the bases are no longer stacked as they are in dsDNA, so that orbital overlap is minimized and UV absorbance increases. This increase in absorbance underlies the basis of the Kunitz unit of DNase activity. One Kunitz unit is defined as the amount of enzyme added to 1 mg/ml salmon sperm DNA that causes an increase in absorbance of 0.001 per minute at the wavelength of 260 nm when acting upon highly polymerized DNA at 25 °C in a 0.1 M NaOAc (pH 5.0) buffer. The unit's name recognizes the Russian-American biochemist Moses Kunitz, who proposed the standard test in 1946.

A standard enzyme preparation should be run in parallel with an unknown because standardization of DNA preparations and their degree of polymerization in solution is not possible.

Single Radial Enzyme Diffusion (SRED) is a method for DNase I activity measurement that was introduced by Nadano et al., and is based on the digestion of DNA in the agarose gel by DNase, which is present in samples punched into the gel. DNase activity is represented by the size of a dispensed circular well in an agarose gel layer, in which DNA stained by ethidium bromide is uniformly distributed. After the incubation, a circular dark zone is formed as the enzyme diffuses from the well radially into the gel and cleaves DNA. SRED underwent many modifications, which led to an increase in sensitivity and safety, such as the replacement of ethidium bromide with SYBR Green I or other DNA gel stains.

A kinetic colorimetric DNase I activity assay was developed for the assessment of the stability of the human recombinant DNase I (Pulmozyme). The method was adjusted from a colorimetric endpoint enzyme activity assay based on the degradation of a DNA/methyl green complex.

== Virulence factor ==
Extracellular deoxribonucleases act as virulence factors for pathogens, including Plasmodium and several Streptococcus species, as they allow the pathogens to defend themselves against neutrophil extracellular traps which consist primarily of histone-linked extracellular DNA.

== See also ==
- Extracellular DNA (eDNA)
- Deoxyribonuclease I (DNase I)
- Deoxyribonuclease II (DNase II)
- Endonuclease
- Enzyme
- Hydrolysis
- Phosphodiester linkages
