= INPP5A =

Protein-coding gene in the species Homo sapiens

Identifiers
- Aliases: INPP5A, 5PTASE, inositol polyphosphate-5-phosphatase A
- External IDs: OMIM: 600106; MGI: 2686961; GeneCards: INPP5A
Enzyme activity
EC #	BRENDA	ExPASy	KEGG	MetaCyc
3.1.3.56	↗	↗	↗	↗

Gene location (Human)
Chr.	Chromosome 10 (human)
Band	10q26.3	Start	132,537,787 bp
Band	10q26.3	End	132,783,480 bp

Gene location (Mouse)
Chr.	Chromosome 7 (mouse)
Band	7|7 F4	Start	138,969,025 bp
Band	7|7 F4	End	139,159,568 bp
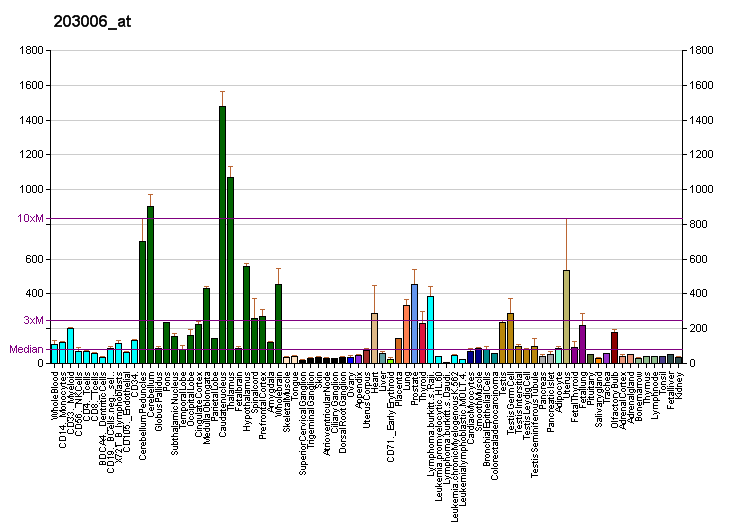
RNA expression pattern
Bgee	Human / Mouse (ortholog); Top expressed in: lateral nuclear group of thalamus; saphenous vein; myocardium of left ventricle; middle temporal gyrus; popliteal artery; tibial arteries; sperm; external globus pallidus; right ventricle; gastric mucosa / Top expressed in: Ileal epithelium; cardiac muscle tissue of left ventricle; lobe of cerebellum; right ventricle; cerebellar vermis; interventricular septum; plantaris muscle; ascending aorta; extensor digitorum longus muscle; soleus muscle; More reference expression data
BioGPS	More reference expression data
Gene ontology
Molecular function	PH domain binding; inositol-1,3,4,5-tetrakisphosphate 5-phosphatase activity; protein binding; hydrolase activity; inositol-1,4,5-trisphosphate 5-phosphatase activity; inositol-polyphosphate 5-phosphatase activity
Cellular component	plasma membrane; membrane; intracellular anatomical structure
Biological process	inositol phosphate metabolic process; phosphatidylinositol dephosphorylation; inositol phosphate-mediated signaling; inositol phosphate dephosphorylation; dephosphorylation
Sources:Amigo / QuickGO
Orthologs
Databases	NCBI: entry; OMA: entry
Species	Human	Mouse
Entrez	3632	212111
Ensembl	ENSG00000068383	ENSMUSG00000025477
UniProt	Q14642; Q5T1B3	Q7TNC9
RefSeq (mRNA)	NM_005539; NM_001321042	NM_001127363; NM_183144; NM_001355162
RefSeq (protein)	NP_001307971; NP_005530	NP_001120835; NP_001342091; NP_898967
Location (UCSC)	Chr 10: 132.54 – 132.78 Mb	Chr 7: 138.97 – 139.16 Mb
PubMed search
- Wikidata
View/Edit Human	View/Edit Mouse

Type I inositol-1,4,5-trisphosphate 5-phosphatase is an enzyme that in humans is encoded by the INPP5A gene.

The protein encoded by this gene is a membrane-associated type I inositol 1,4,5-trisphosphate (InsP3) 5-phosphatase. InsP3 5-phosphatases hydrolyze Ins (1,4,5)P3, which mobilizes intracellular calcium and acts as a second messenger mediating cell responses to various stimulation.
