= Exodeoxyribonuclease =

Class of enzymes

Exodeoxyribonucleases are both exonucleases and deoxyribonucleases. They catalyze digestion of the ends of linear DNA. They are a type of esterase. They are classified EC 3.1.11.

== See also ==
- Deoxyribonuclease
