= INPP5J =

Protein-coding gene in humans

Identifiers
- Aliases: INPP5J, INPP5, PIB5PA, PIPP, inositol polyphosphate-5-phosphatase J
- External IDs: OMIM: 606481; MGI: 2158663; GeneCards: INPP5J
Enzyme activity
EC #	BRENDA	ExPASy	KEGG	MetaCyc
3.1.3.36	↗	↗	↗	↗
3.1.3.56	↗	↗	↗	↗

Gene location (Human)
Chr.	Chromosome 22 (human)
Band	22q12.2	Start	31,122,731 bp
Band	22q12.2	End	31,134,697 bp

Gene location (Mouse)
Chr.	Chromosome 11 (mouse)
Band	11|11 A1	Start	3,494,375 bp
Band	11|11 A1	End	3,504,821 bp
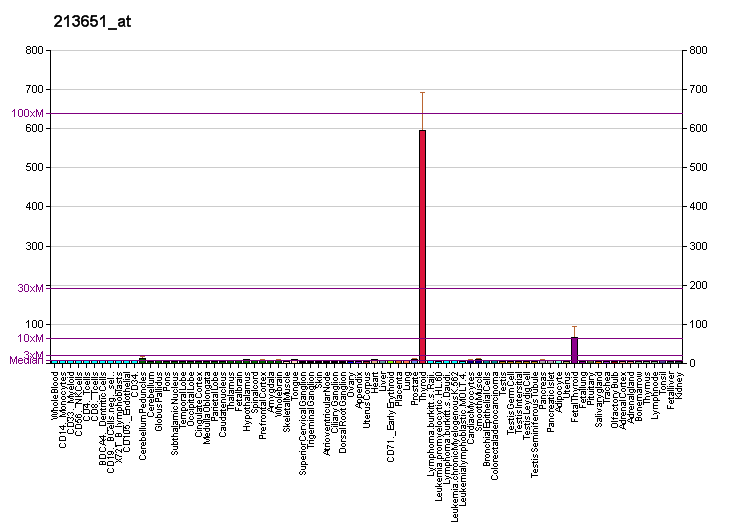
RNA expression pattern
Bgee	Human / Mouse (ortholog); Top expressed in: right lobe of thyroid gland; left lobe of thyroid gland; right hemisphere of cerebellum; mucosa of transverse colon; parotid gland; apex of heart; right auricle of heart; left ventricle; duodenum; body of pancreas / Top expressed in: cerebellar cortex; submandibular gland; primary visual cortex; CA3 field; superior frontal gyrus; perirhinal cortex; entorhinal cortex; dentate gyrus of hippocampal formation granule cell; masseter muscle; medulla oblongata; More reference expression data
BioGPS	More reference expression data
Gene ontology
Molecular function	SH3 domain binding; inositol-polyphosphate 5-phosphatase activity; protein binding; hydrolase activity; phosphatidylinositol-4,5-bisphosphate 5-phosphatase activity; phosphatidylinositol-3,4,5-trisphosphate 5-phosphatase activity; inositol-1,4,5-trisphosphate 5-phosphatase activity; inositol-1,3,4,5-tetrakisphosphate 5-phosphatase activity
Cellular component	cytoplasm; ruffle; growth cone; dendritic shaft; cytosol; plasma membrane
Biological process	phosphatidylinositol biosynthetic process; negative regulation of neuron projection development; inositol phosphate metabolic process; negative regulation of microtubule polymerization; phosphatidylinositol dephosphorylation; negative regulation of peptidyl-serine phosphorylation; inositol phosphate dephosphorylation
Sources:Amigo / QuickGO
Orthologs
Databases	NCBI: entry; OMA: entry
Species	Human	Mouse
Entrez	27124	170835
Ensembl	ENSG00000185133	ENSMUSG00000034570
UniProt	Q15735	P59644
RefSeq (mRNA)	NM_001002837; NM_001284285; NM_001284286; NM_001284287; NM_001284288 NM_001284289; NM_014422	NM_172439
RefSeq (protein)	NP_001002837; NP_001271214; NP_001271215; NP_001271216; NP_001271217 NP_001271218	NP_766027
Location (UCSC)	Chr 22: 31.12 – 31.13 Mb	Chr 11: 3.49 – 3.5 Mb
PubMed search
- Wikidata
View/Edit Human	View/Edit Mouse

Phosphatidylinositol 4,5-bisphosphate 5-phosphatase A, is an enzyme that in humans is encoded by the INPP5J gene. Also called Inositol polyphosphate-5-phosphatase J, this enzyme is part of the inositol-polyphosphate 5-phosphatase family of enzymes.
