= Endodeoxyribonuclease =

Class of enzymes which cleave DNA

In biochemistry, an endodeoxyribonuclease is a class of enzyme which is a type of deoxyribonuclease (a DNA cleaver), itself a type of endonuclease (a nucleotide cleaver). They catalyze cleavage of the phosphodiester bonds in DNA. They are classified with EC numbers 3.1.21 through 3.1.25.

Examples include:

- DNA restriction enzymes
- micrococcal nuclease

== See also ==
- Ribonuclease
- UvrABC endonuclease
