= SYNJ2 =

Protein-coding gene in the species Homo sapiens

Identifiers
- Aliases: SYNJ2, INPP5H, synaptojanin 2
- External IDs: OMIM: 609410; MGI: 1201671; GeneCards: SYNJ2
Available structures
PDB	Ortholog search: PDBe RCSB
PDB	List of PDB id codes 1UFW
Enzyme activity
EC #	BRENDA	ExPASy	KEGG	MetaCyc
3.1.3.36	↗	↗	↗	↗
3.1.3.95	↗	↗	↗	↗

Gene location (Human)
Chr.	Chromosome 6 (human)
Band	6q25.3	Start	157,981,863 bp
Band	6q25.3	End	158,099,176 bp

Gene location (Mouse)
Chr.	Chromosome 17 (mouse)
Band	17 A1|17 3.59 cM	Start	5,991,555 bp
Band	17 A1|17 3.59 cM	End	6,094,565 bp
RNA expression pattern
Bgee	Human / Mouse (ortholog); Top expressed in: inferior ganglion of vagus nerve; internal globus pallidus; C1 segment; subthalamic nucleus; medulla oblongata; pons; superior vestibular nucleus; corpus callosum; inferior olivary nucleus; ventral tegmental area / Top expressed in: muscle of thigh; spermatid; primary visual cortex; dentate gyrus of hippocampal formation granule cell; ascending aorta; soleus muscle; right ventricle; lumbar subsegment of spinal cord; superior frontal gyrus; temporal muscle; More reference expression data
BioGPS	n/a
Gene ontology
Molecular function	phosphoric ester hydrolase activity; protein binding; hydrolase activity; RNA binding; nucleic acid binding; phosphatidylinositol-3,5-bisphosphate 5-phosphatase activity; phosphatidylinositol phosphate 4-phosphatase activity; phosphatidylinositol-4,5-bisphosphate 5-phosphatase activity; phosphatidylinositol-3-phosphatase activity; phosphatidylinositol-3,5-bisphosphate 3-phosphatase activity; phosphatidylinositol phosphate 5-phosphatase activity; inositol-polyphosphate 5-phosphatase activity; SH3 domain binding; PDZ domain binding; phosphatidylinositol-4-phosphate phosphatase activity
Cellular component	cytoplasm; membrane raft; axon; cytosol; plasma membrane; cell projection; cytoskeleton; membrane; cytoplasmic microtubule; extrinsic component of mitochondrial outer membrane; ruffle membrane; axon terminus; perinuclear region of cytoplasm; presynapse
Biological process	phosphatidylinositol biosynthetic process; phosphatidylinositol dephosphorylation; phosphatidylinositol-3-phosphate biosynthetic process; membrane organization; brain development; inositol phosphate dephosphorylation
Sources:Amigo / QuickGO
Orthologs
Databases	NCBI: entry; OMA: entry
Species	Human	Mouse
Entrez	8871	20975
Ensembl	ENSG00000078269	ENSMUSG00000023805
UniProt	O15056	Q9D2G5
RefSeq (mRNA)	NM_001178088; NM_003898	NM_001113351; NM_001113352; NM_001113353; NM_001290698; NM_011523 NM_001357665; NM_001357667
RefSeq (protein)	NP_001171559; NP_003889	NP_001106822; NP_001106823; NP_001106824; NP_001277627; NP_035653 NP_001344594; NP_001344596
Location (UCSC)	Chr 6: 157.98 – 158.1 Mb	Chr 17: 5.99 – 6.09 Mb
PubMed search
- Wikidata
View/Edit Human	View/Edit Mouse

Synaptojanin 2 is a protein that in humans is encoded by the SYNJ2 gene.

== Function ==
The gene is a member of the inositol-polyphosphate 5-phosphatase family. The encoded protein interacts with the ras-related C3 botulinum toxin substrate 1, which causes translocation of the encoded protein to the plasma membrane where it inhibits clathrin-mediated endocytosis. Alternative splicing results in multiple transcript variants. [provided by RefSeq, May 2010].
