= SMPD3 =

Protein-coding gene in the species Homo sapiens

Identifiers
- Aliases: SMPD3, NSMASE2, sphingomyelin phosphodiesterase 3
- External IDs: OMIM: 605777; MGI: 1927578; GeneCards: SMPD3
Enzyme activity
EC #	BRENDA	ExPASy	KEGG	MetaCyc
3.1.4.12	↗	↗	↗	↗

Gene location (Human)
Chr.	Chromosome 16 (human)
Band	16q22.1	Start	68,358,327 bp
Band	16q22.1	End	68,448,508 bp

Gene location (Mouse)
Chr.	Chromosome 8 (mouse)
Band	8|8 D3	Start	106,979,180 bp
Band	8|8 D3	End	107,064,620 bp
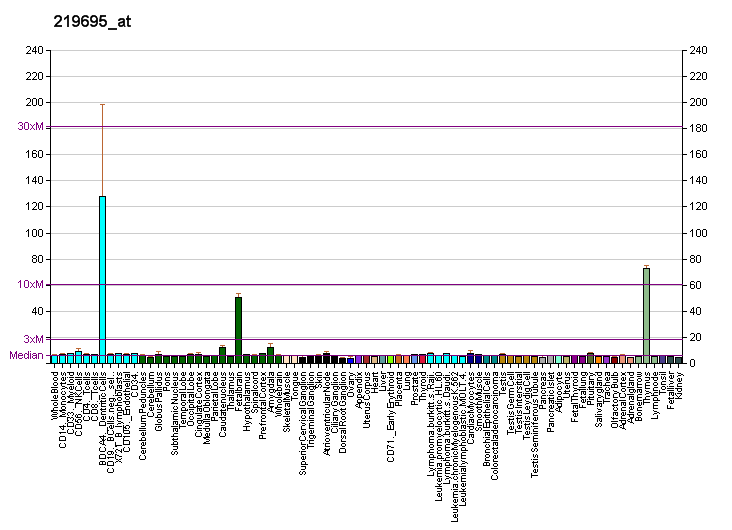
RNA expression pattern
Bgee	Human / Mouse (ortholog); Top expressed in: tibia; duodenum; periodontal fiber; thymus; jejunal mucosa; ganglionic eminence; mucosa of transverse colon; putamen; right hemisphere of cerebellum; rectum / Top expressed in: membranous bone; Dermatocranium; calvaria; mandible; maxilla; lumbar spinal ganglion; olfactory tubercle; long bone; body of femur; molar; More reference expression data
BioGPS	More reference expression data
Gene ontology
Molecular function	sphingomyelin phosphodiesterase activity; metal ion binding; hydrolase activity; protein binding; neutral sphingomyelin phosphodiesterase activity; phospholipase activity
Cellular component	Golgi apparatus; membrane; Golgi membrane; Golgi cis cisterna; plasma membrane; cytoplasm
Biological process	positive regulation of ceramide biosynthetic process; lipid metabolism; multicellular organism development; sphingomyelin catabolic process; peptide hormone secretion; hematopoietic progenitor cell differentiation; cell cycle; positive regulation of exosomal secretion; sphingomyelin metabolic process; sphingolipid metabolic process; skeletal system development; endochondral ossification; chondrocyte development; regulation of leukocyte migration; bone mineralization; BMP signaling pathway; multicellular organism growth; protein kinase B signaling; cartilage development; protein homooligomerization; bone development; regulation of cartilage development; cellular response to redox state; bone growth; cellular response to peptide; ossification; regulation of protein phosphorylation; chondrocyte development involved in endochondral bone morphogenesis; ceramide metabolic process; glycosphingolipid metabolic process; signal transduction; polysaccharide transport; lung development; collagen metabolic process; cellular response to reactive oxygen species; positive regulation of mitotic nuclear division; platelet-derived growth factor receptor signaling pathway; lung alveolus development; positive regulation of smooth muscle cell proliferation; respiratory system development; cellular response to hydrogen peroxide; G1 to G0 transition; cellular response to magnesium ion; cellular response to tumor necrosis factor; DNA biosynthetic process; extracellular matrix assembly; sphingolipid mediated signaling pathway; dentinogenesis; mitotic nuclear division; cellular response to oxidised low-density lipoprotein particle stimulus; regulation of hyaluronan biosynthetic process; negative regulation of hyaluronan biosynthetic process
Sources:Amigo / QuickGO
Orthologs
Databases	NCBI: entry; OMA: entry
Species	Human	Mouse
Entrez	55512	58994
Ensembl	ENSG00000103056	ENSMUSG00000031906
UniProt	Q9NY59	Q9JJY3
RefSeq (mRNA)	NM_018667	NM_021491
RefSeq (protein)	NP_061137	NP_067466
Location (UCSC)	Chr 16: 68.36 – 68.45 Mb	Chr 8: 106.98 – 107.06 Mb
PubMed search
- Wikidata
View/Edit Human	View/Edit Mouse

Neutral Sphingomyelinase2 is an enzyme that in humans is encoded by the SMPD3 gene.
