= ANGEL2 =

Protein-coding gene in humans

Identifiers
- Aliases: ANGEL2, Ccr4d, KIAA0759L, angel homolog 2 (Drosophila), angel homolog 2
- External IDs: MGI: 1196310; GeneCards: ANGEL2

Gene location (Human)
Chr.	Chromosome 1 (human)
Band	1q32.3	Start	212,992,182 bp
Band	1q32.3	End	213,015,867 bp

Gene location (Mouse)
Chr.	Chromosome 1 (mouse)
Band	1 H6|1 96.28 cM	Start	190,657,309 bp
Band	1 H6|1 96.28 cM	End	190,679,159 bp
RNA expression pattern
Bgee	Human / Mouse (ortholog); Top expressed in: Achilles tendon; Brodmann area 23; monocyte; gastric mucosa; visceral pleura; parietal pleura; tibial nerve; primary visual cortex; left ovary; canal of the cervix / Top expressed in: Rostral migratory stream; Paneth cell; secondary oocyte; zygote; primary oocyte; medullary collecting duct; ureter; ciliary body; renal corpuscle; retinal pigment epithelium; More reference expression data
BioGPS	n/a
Gene ontology
Molecular function	mRNA 3'-UTR binding; 3'-5'-exoribonuclease activity
Cellular component	cytoplasm; Cajal body
Biological process	negative regulation of mitotic cell cycle; 3'-UTR-mediated mRNA stabilization; RNA phosphodiester bond hydrolysis, exonucleolytic
Sources:Amigo / QuickGO
Orthologs
Databases	NCBI: entry; OMA: entry
Species	Human	Mouse
Entrez	90806	52477
Ensembl	ENSG00000174606	ENSMUSG00000026634
UniProt	Q5VTE6	Q8K1C0
RefSeq (mRNA)	NM_001300753; NM_001300755; NM_001300757; NM_001300758; NM_144567	NM_001199020; NM_021421; NM_001357131; NM_001357132; NM_001357133 NM_001357134
RefSeq (protein)	NP_001287682; NP_001287684; NP_001287686; NP_001287687; NP_653168	NP_001185949; NP_067396; NP_001344060; NP_001344061; NP_001344062 NP_001344063
Location (UCSC)	Chr 1: 212.99 – 213.02 Mb	Chr 1: 190.66 – 190.68 Mb
PubMed search
- Wikidata
View/Edit Human	View/Edit Mouse

Angel homolog 2 is a protein that in humans is encoded by the ANGEL2 gene. ANGEL2 is an RNA 2',3'-cyclic phosphatase involved in RNA processing and cell-cycle regulation.
