= Synaptojanin 1 =

Protein-coding gene in the species Homo sapiens

SYNJ1

Identifiers
- Aliases: SYNJ1, INPP5G, PARK20, synaptojanin 1, EIEE53, DEE53
- External IDs: OMIM: 604297; MGI: 1354961; GeneCards: SYNJ1
Available structures
PDB	Ortholog search: PDBe RCSB
PDB	List of PDB id codes 1W80, 2DNR, 2VJ0
Enzyme activity
EC #	BRENDA	ExPASy	KEGG	MetaCyc
3.1.3.36	↗	↗	↗	↗
3.1.3.95	↗	↗	↗	↗

Gene location (Human)
Chr.	Chromosome 21 (human)
Band	21q22.11	Start	32,628,759 bp
Band	21q22.11	End	32,728,040 bp

Gene location (Mouse)
Chr.	Chromosome 16 (mouse)
Band	16|16 C3.3	Start	90,732,980 bp
Band	16|16 C3.3	End	90,808,196 bp
RNA expression pattern
Bgee	Human / Mouse (ortholog); Top expressed in: Brodmann area 23; lateral nuclear group of thalamus; pons; pars compacta; pars reticulata; middle temporal gyrus; superior frontal gyrus; endothelial cell; postcentral gyrus; superior vestibular nucleus / Top expressed in: pontine nuclei; subiculum; subdivision of hippocampus; Region I of hippocampus proper; prefrontal cortex; medial vestibular nucleus; temporal lobe; amygdala; medial dorsal nucleus; facial motor nucleus; More reference expression data
BioGPS	n/a
Gene ontology
Molecular function	RNA binding; nucleic acid binding; phosphoric ester hydrolase activity; hydrolase activity; phosphatidylinositol-3,5-bisphosphate 5-phosphatase activity; phosphatidylinositol phosphate 4-phosphatase activity; inositol-1,4,5-trisphosphate 5-phosphatase activity; phosphatidylinositol-4,5-bisphosphate 5-phosphatase activity; phosphatidylinositol-4-phosphate phosphatase activity; inositol-1,3,4,5-tetrakisphosphate 5-phosphatase activity; phosphatidylinositol-3-phosphatase activity; phosphatidylinositol-3,5-bisphosphate 3-phosphatase activity; phosphatidylinositol phosphate 5-phosphatase activity; protein binding; SH3 domain binding
Cellular component	cytoplasm; membrane coat; vesicle membrane; presynapse; synaptic membrane; clathrin coat of coated pit; terminal bouton; microtubule; perinuclear region of cytoplasm; cytosol; neuron projection; postsynapse
Biological process	endocytosis; phosphatidylinositol metabolic process; inositol phosphate metabolic process; learning; synaptic vesicle uncoating; synaptic vesicle priming; phosphatidylinositol biosynthetic process; synaptic vesicle transport; neurotransmitter transport; inositol phosphate dephosphorylation; phosphatidylinositol dephosphorylation; positive regulation of endosome organization; phosphatidylinositol-3-phosphate biosynthetic process; membrane organization; synaptic vesicle endocytosis; brain development; positive regulation of gliogenesis; response to retinoic acid; response to cytokine; positive regulation of receptor-mediated endocytosis; postsynaptic neurotransmitter receptor internalization
Sources:Amigo / QuickGO
Orthologs
Databases	NCBI: entry; OMA: entry
Species	Human	Mouse
Entrez	8867	104015
Ensembl	ENSG00000159082	ENSMUSG00000022973
UniProt	O43426	Q8CHC4
RefSeq (mRNA)	NM_203446; NM_001160302; NM_001160306; NM_003895	NM_001045515; NM_001164483
RefSeq (protein)	NP_001153774; NP_001153778; NP_003886; NP_982271	n/a
Location (UCSC)	Chr 21: 32.63 – 32.73 Mb	Chr 16: 90.73 – 90.81 Mb
PubMed search
- Wikidata
View/Edit Human	View/Edit Mouse

Synaptojanin 1 is a protein that in humans is encoded by the SYNJ1 gene.

== Function ==
This gene encodes a phosphoinositide phosphatase that regulates levels of membrane phosphatidylinositol-4,5-bisphosphate. As such, expression of this enzyme may affect synaptic transmission and membrane trafficking. Multiple transcript variants encoding different isoforms have been found for this gene.
