= Dornase alfa =

Pharmaceutical drug

Clinical data
- Trade names: Pulmozyme
- AHFS/Drugs.com: Monograph
- MedlinePlus: a694002
- License data: US DailyMed: Dornase alfa
- Pregnancy category: AU: B1
- Routes of administration: Inhalation
- ATC code: R05CB13 (WHO)

Legal status
- Legal status: AU: S4 (Prescription only); CA: ℞-only / Schedule D; US: ℞-only; In general: ℞ (Prescription only)

Identifiers
- CAS Number: 143831-71-4
- DrugBank: DB00003
- ChemSpider: none
- UNII: 953A26OA1Y
- KEGG: D03896
- CompTox Dashboard (EPA): DTXSID801010888
- ECHA InfoCard: 100.029.685

Chemical and physical data
- Formula: C_{1321}H_{1999}N_{339}O_{396}S_{9}
- Molar mass: 29254.04 g·mol^{−1}

Dornase alfa, sold under the brand name Pulmozyme, is a drug used for the treatment of cystic fibrosis. It is a recombinant human deoxyribonuclease I (rhDNase), an enzyme which selectively cleaves DNA. Dornase alfa hydrolyzes the DNA present in sputum/mucus and reduces viscosity in the lungs, promoting improved clearance of secretions. It is produced in Chinese hamster ovary cells.

== Medical uses ==
Dornase alfa is indicated for the management of people with cystic fibrosis to improve pulmonary function.

A 2021 Cochrane systematic review found that dornase alfa probably improves lung function (FEV1) compared with placebo/no dornase alfa at multiple time points (including one and six months), while evidence for quality-of-life outcomes was limited. Rash and voice change were reported more frequently than with control, while serious adverse effects were not reported in the included trials.

== Pharmacology ==
=== Mechanism of action ===
Dornase alfa is a recombinant human DNase I that selectively cleaves DNA, by hydrolyzing extracellular DNA in sputum/mucus it reduces mucus viscosity and improves clearance of secretions.

=== Production ===
The FDA label states that dornase alfa is produced by genetically engineered Chinese hamster ovary (CHO) cells containing DNA encoding the native human DNase I protein.

== Society and culture ==
=== Legal status ===
Dornase alfa is an orphan drug.

== Research ==
Dornase alfa has been shown to improve lung function in non-cystic fibrosis pre-term infants atelectasis.

== See also ==
- Mucolytic
