= INPP5K =

Protein-coding gene in humans

Identifiers
- Aliases: INPP5K, PPS, SKIP, inositol polyphosphate-5-phosphatase K, MDCCAID
- External IDs: OMIM: 607875; MGI: 1194899; GeneCards: INPP5K
Enzyme activity
EC #	BRENDA	ExPASy	KEGG	MetaCyc
3.1.3.36	↗	↗	↗	↗
3.1.3.56	↗	↗	↗	↗
3.1.3.86	↗	↗	↗	↗

Gene location (Human)
Chr.	Chromosome 17 (human)
Band	17p13.3	Start	1,494,577 bp
Band	17p13.3	End	1,516,742 bp

Gene location (Mouse)
Chr.	Chromosome 11 (mouse)
Band	11 B5|11 45.92 cM	Start	75,521,814 bp
Band	11 B5|11 45.92 cM	End	75,539,697 bp
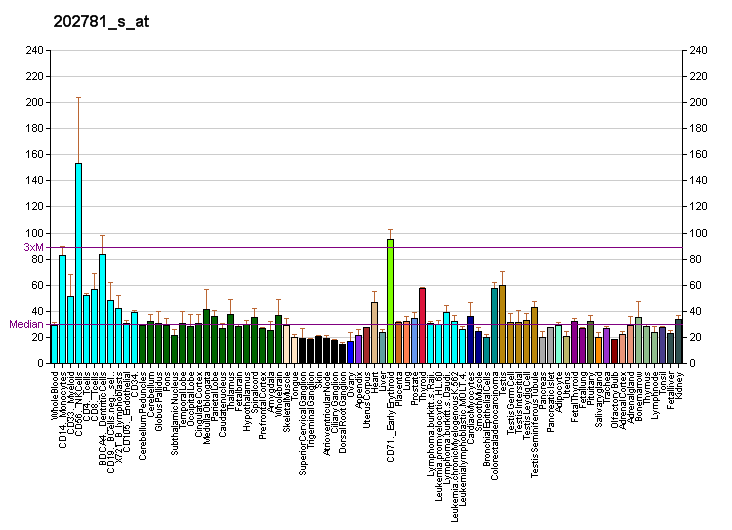

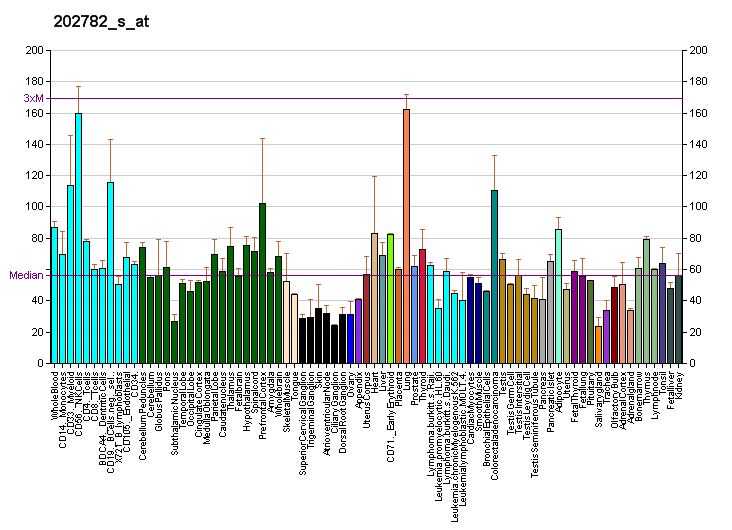
RNA expression pattern
Bgee	Human / Mouse (ortholog); Top expressed in: retinal pigment epithelium; right lung; right lobe of thyroid gland; left lobe of thyroid gland; apex of heart; granulocyte; skin of leg; upper lobe of left lung; gastric mucosa; skin of abdomen / Top expressed in: retinal pigment epithelium; spermatocyte; spermatid; granulocyte; parotid gland; thymus; olfactory epithelium; right lung; right lung lobe; neural layer of retina; More reference expression data
BioGPS	More reference expression data
Gene ontology
Molecular function	inositol-1,3,4,5-tetrakisphosphate 5-phosphatase activity; inositol-1,4,5-trisphosphate 5-phosphatase activity; inositol bisphosphate phosphatase activity; inositol-polyphosphate 5-phosphatase activity; phosphatidylinositol phosphate 5-phosphatase activity; phosphatidylinositol trisphosphate phosphatase activity; protein binding; lipid phosphatase activity; inositol trisphosphate phosphatase activity; hydrolase activity; vasopressin receptor activity; phosphatidylinositol-3,4,5-trisphosphate 5-phosphatase activity; phosphatidylinositol-4,5-bisphosphate 5-phosphatase activity
Cellular component	cytoplasm; cytosol; membrane; ruffle; plasma membrane; ruffle membrane; trans-Golgi network; endoplasmic reticulum; perinuclear region of cytoplasm; neuron projection; nucleus
Biological process	negative regulation of protein phosphorylation; G protein-coupled receptor signaling pathway; negative regulation of protein kinase B signaling; positive regulation of urine volume; negative regulation of dephosphorylation; negative regulation of protein kinase activity; glucose homeostasis; cellular response to tumor necrosis factor; negative regulation of peptidyl-threonine phosphorylation; in utero embryonic development; negative regulation of glycogen biosynthetic process; positive regulation of renal water transport; cellular response to epidermal growth factor stimulus; positive regulation of transcription, DNA-templated; response to insulin; negative regulation of insulin receptor signaling pathway; negative regulation of protein targeting to membrane; cellular response to hormone stimulus; negative regulation of glucose transmembrane transport; negative regulation of glycogen (starch) synthase activity; phosphatidylinositol dephosphorylation; negative regulation of MAP kinase activity; negative regulation of calcium ion transport; negative regulation of peptidyl-serine phosphorylation; cellular response to insulin stimulus; phosphatidylinositol biosynthetic process; regulation of glycogen biosynthetic process; negative regulation of stress fiber assembly; negative regulation of transcription, DNA-templated; ruffle assembly; inositol phosphate dephosphorylation; actin cytoskeleton organization; cellular response to cAMP; dephosphorylation; negative regulation of single stranded viral RNA replication via double stranded DNA intermediate; protein localization to plasma membrane; negative regulation by host of viral transcription; neuromuscular junction development, skeletal muscle fiber
Sources:Amigo / QuickGO
Orthologs
Databases	NCBI: entry; OMA: entry
Species	Human	Mouse
Entrez	51763	19062
Ensembl	ENSG00000132376	ENSMUSG00000006127
UniProt	Q9BT40	Q8C5L6
RefSeq (mRNA)	NM_001135642; NM_016532; NM_130766	NM_008916
RefSeq (protein)	NP_001129114; NP_057616; NP_570122	NP_032942
Location (UCSC)	Chr 17: 1.49 – 1.52 Mb	Chr 11: 75.52 – 75.54 Mb
PubMed search
- Wikidata
View/Edit Human	View/Edit Mouse

Inositol polyphosphate 5-phosphatase K is an enzyme that in humans is encoded by the gene INPP5K (previously SKIP).

== Function ==
This gene encodes a protein with 5-phosphatase activity toward polyphosphate inositol. The protein localizes to the cytosol in regions lacking actin stress fibers. It is thought that this protein may negatively regulate the actin cytoskeleton. Alternative splicing of this gene results in two transcript variants encoding different isoforms. Overexpression of SKIP in mice affects osmoregulation in kidney collecting ducts.

== Other names ==
INPP5K has also been called SKIP, which stands for "Skeletal muscle and kidney enriched inositol phosphatase."
