= ANGEL1 =

Protein-coding gene in humans

Identifiers
- Aliases: ANGEL1, Ccr4e, KIAA0759, angel homolog 1 (Drosophila), angel homolog 1
- External IDs: MGI: 1915987; GeneCards: ANGEL1

Gene location (Human)
Chr.	Chromosome 14 (human)
Band	14q24.3	Start	76,786,178 bp
Band	14q24.3	End	76,826,246 bp

Gene location (Mouse)
Chr.	Chromosome 12 (mouse)
Band	12|12 D2	Start	86,747,276 bp
Band	12|12 D2	End	86,773,234 bp
RNA expression pattern
Bgee	Human / Mouse (ortholog); Top expressed in: right testis; left testis; body of pancreas; islet of Langerhans; C1 segment; spleen; right adrenal gland; right adrenal cortex; apex of heart; left adrenal gland / Top expressed in: spermatid; spermatocyte; zygote; seminiferous tubule; secondary oocyte; lumbar spinal ganglion; primary oocyte; parotid gland; lacrimal gland; facial motor nucleus; More reference expression data
BioGPS	n/a
Gene ontology
Molecular function	eukaryotic initiation factor 4E binding; protein domain specific binding; 3'-5'-exoribonuclease activity
Cellular component	cis-Golgi network; cytosol; perinuclear region of cytoplasm; endoplasmic reticulum; nucleus
Biological process	RNA phosphodiester bond hydrolysis, exonucleolytic
Sources:Amigo / QuickGO
Orthologs
Databases	NCBI: entry; OMA: entry
Species	Human	Mouse
Entrez	23357	68737
Ensembl	ENSG00000013523	ENSMUSG00000021257
UniProt	Q9UNK9	Q8VCU0
RefSeq (mRNA)	NM_015305	NM_144524
RefSeq (protein)	NP_056120; NP_001357675; NP_001357676; NP_001357677	NP_653107
Location (UCSC)	Chr 14: 76.79 – 76.83 Mb	Chr 12: 86.75 – 86.77 Mb
PubMed search
- Wikidata
View/Edit Human	View/Edit Mouse

Angel homolog 1 is a protein that in humans is encoded by the ANGEL1 gene. ANGEL1 is an RNA 2',3'-cyclic phosphatase involved in mRNA turnover and non-stop mRNA decay.
