= INPP5B =

Protein-coding gene in humans

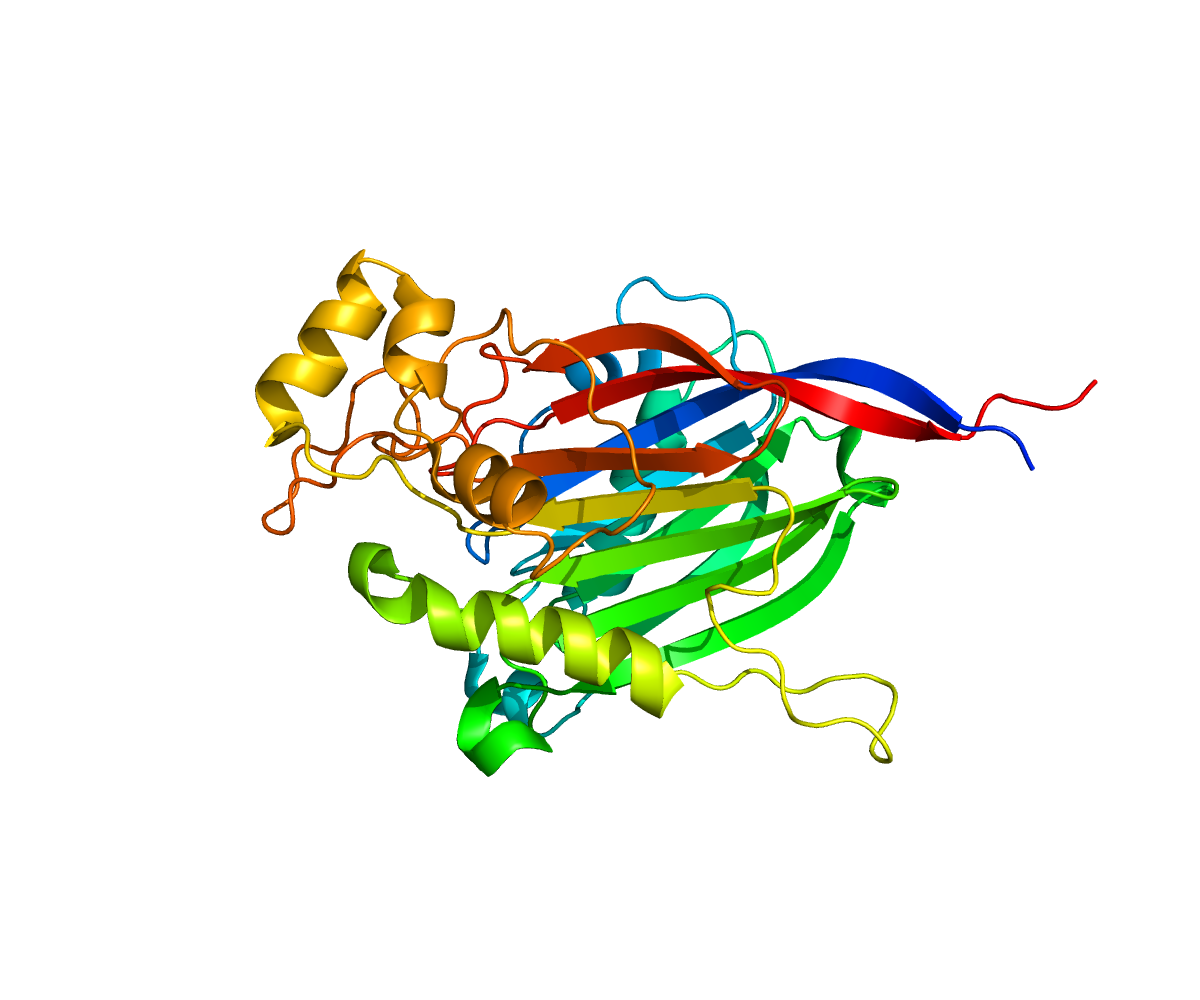

Identifiers
- Aliases: INPP5B, 5PTase, inositol polyphosphate-5-phosphatase B
- External IDs: OMIM: 147264; MGI: 103257; GeneCards: INPP5B
Available structures
PDB	Ortholog search: PDBe RCSB
PDB	List of PDB id codes 3MTC, 3N9V, 4CML, 5A7J, 5A7I
Enzyme activity
EC #	BRENDA	ExPASy	KEGG	MetaCyc
3.1.3.36	↗	↗	↗	↗
3.1.3.56	↗	↗	↗	↗

Gene location (Human)
Chr.	Chromosome 1 (human)
Band	1p34.3	Start	37,860,697 bp
Band	1p34.3	End	37,947,057 bp

Gene location (Mouse)
Chr.	Chromosome 4 (mouse)
Band	4 D2.2|4 57.89 cM	Start	124,635,643 bp
Band	4 D2.2|4 57.89 cM	End	124,695,304 bp
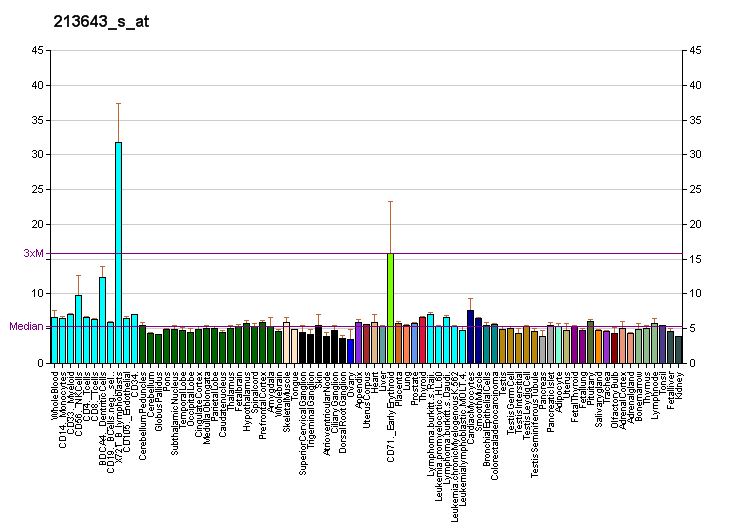

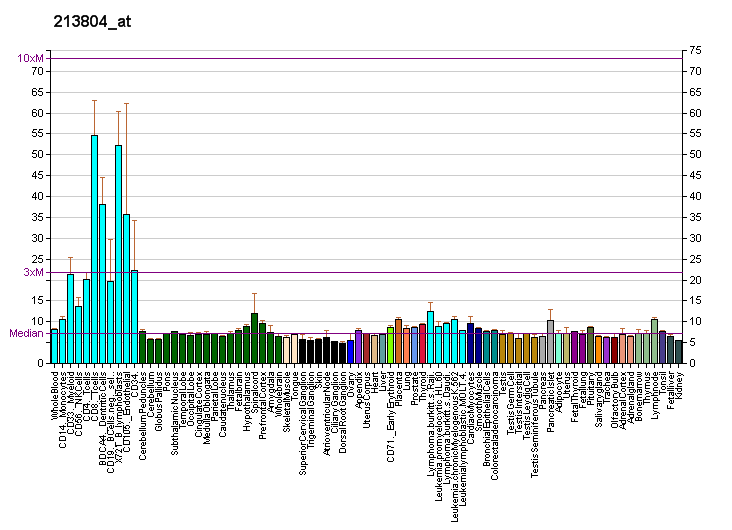
RNA expression pattern
Bgee	Human / Mouse (ortholog); Top expressed in: left ovary; gastric mucosa; popliteal artery; tibial arteries; right coronary artery; right ovary; ascending aorta; granulocyte; left coronary artery; cerebellar hemisphere / Top expressed in: right lung lobe; neural layer of retina; left lung; right kidney; proximal tubule; human kidney; granulocyte; lobe of cerebellum; cerebellar vermis; primary oocyte; More reference expression data
BioGPS	More reference expression data
Gene ontology
Molecular function	metal ion binding; phosphatidylinositol-4,5-bisphosphate 5-phosphatase activity; protein binding; hydrolase activity; GTPase activator activity; inositol-1,4,5-trisphosphate 5-phosphatase activity; inositol-1,3,4,5-tetrakisphosphate 5-phosphatase activity; inositol phosphate phosphatase activity
Cellular component	integral component of membrane; cytosol; endosome; phagocytic vesicle membrane; Golgi apparatus; early endosome membrane; membrane; plasma membrane; cytoplasmic vesicle; endoplasmic reticulum-Golgi intermediate compartment; cytoplasm
Biological process	flagellated sperm motility; in utero embryonic development; inositol phosphate metabolic process; regulation of protein processing; phosphatidylinositol dephosphorylation; spermatogenesis; regulation of small GTPase mediated signal transduction; signal transduction; positive regulation of GTPase activity; inositol phosphate dephosphorylation
Sources:Amigo / QuickGO
Orthologs
Databases	NCBI: entry; OMA: entry
Species	Human	Mouse
Entrez	3633	16330
Ensembl	ENSG00000204084	ENSMUSG00000028894
UniProt	P32019	Q8K337
RefSeq (mRNA)	NM_001297434; NM_005540; NM_001350227; NM_001350228	NM_008385
RefSeq (protein)	NP_001284363; NP_005531; NP_001337156; NP_001337157; NP_001352749 NP_001352750; NP_001352751; NP_001352752; NP_001352753; NP_001352754	NP_032411
Location (UCSC)	Chr 1: 37.86 – 37.95 Mb	Chr 4: 124.64 – 124.7 Mb
PubMed search
- Wikidata
View/Edit Human	View/Edit Mouse

Type II inositol-1,4,5-trisphosphate 5-phosphatase is an enzyme that in humans is encoded by the INPP5B gene.

Cellular calcium signaling is controlled by the production of inositol phosphates (IPs) by phospholipase C in response to extracellular signals. The IP signaling molecules are inactivated by a family of inositol polyphosphate-5-phosphatases (5-phosphatases). This gene encodes the type II 5-phosphatase. The protein is localized to the cytosol and mitochondria, and associates with membranes through an isoprenyl modification near the C-terminus. Several alternatively spliced transcript variants of this gene have been described, but the full-length nature of some of these variants has not been determined.
