= Phosphoric monoester hydrolases =

Phosphoric monoester hydrolases (or phosphomonoesterases) are enzymes that catalyse the hydrolysis of O-P bonds by nucleophilic attack of phosphorus by cysteine residues or coordinated metal ions.

They are categorized with the EC number 3.1.3.

Examples include:

- acid phosphatase
- alkaline phosphatase
- fructose-bisphosphatase
- glucose-6-phosphatase
- phosphofructokinase-2
- phosphoprotein phosphatase
- calcineurin
- 6-phytase

== See also ==
- phosphodiesterase
- phosphatase
