= Inositol-polyphosphate 5-phosphatase =

Class of enzymes

Identifiers
- EC no.: 3.1.3.56
- CAS no.: 106283-14-1

Databases
- BRENDA: enzyme data
- ExPASy: NiceZyme view
- KEGG: enzyme entry
- MetaCyc: metabolic pathway
- Rhea: reactions
- PDB structures: RCSB PDB PDBe PDBsum
Search
- PMC: articles
- PubMed: articles
- NCBI: proteins

The enzyme inositol-polyphosphate 5-phosphatase (EC 3.1.3.56), systematic name 1D-myo-inositol-1,4,5-trisphosphate 5-phosphohydrolase, catalyses two related reactions.

The first produces D-myo-inositol 1,3,4-trisphosphate from D-myo-inositol 1,3,4,5-tetrakisphosphate. The second produces D-myo-inositol 1,4-bisphosphate from D-myo-inositol 1,4,5-trisphosphate:

D-myo-inositol 1,4,5-trisphosphate
H_{2}O
P_{i}
D-myo-inositol 1,4-bisphosphate

In both cases, the 5-phosphate is removed and the byproduct is orthophosphate (P_{i}}. Ten mammalian isoforms are known. The enzyme is part of an extensive signalling network.

Other names of this enzyme include type I inositol-polyphosphate phosphatase, inositol trisphosphate phosphomonoesterase, InsP_{3}/Ins(1,3,4,5)P_{4} 5-phosphatase, inosine triphosphatase, D-myo-inositol 1,4,5-triphosphate 5-phosphatase, D-myo-inositol 1,4,5-trisphosphate 5-phosphatase, L-myo-inositol 1,4,5-trisphosphate-monoesterase, inositol phosphate 5-phosphomonoesterase, inositol-1,4,5-trisphosphate/1,3,4,5-tetrakisphosphate 5-phosphatase, Ins(1,4,5)P_{3} 5-phosphataseD-myo-inositol(1,4,5)/(1,3,4,5)-polyphosphate 5-phosphatase, inositol 1,4,5-trisphosphate phosphatase, inositol polyphosphate-5-phosphatase, myo-inositol-1,4,5-trisphosphate 5-phosphatase, inositol-1,4,5-trisphosphate 5-phosphatase.
