= Hyperchromicity =

Increase of absorbance (optical density) of a material

Nucleic acid melting curve showing hyperchromicity as a function of temperature

Hyperchromicity is the increase of absorbance (optical density) of a material. The most famous example is the hyperchromicity of DNA that occurs when the DNA duplex is denatured. The UV absorption is increased when the two single DNA strands are being separated, either by heat or by addition of denaturant or by increasing the pH level. The opposite, a decrease of absorbance is called hypochromicity.

== Hyperchromicity in DNA denaturation ==
Heat denaturation of DNA, also called melting, causes the double helix structure to unwind to form single stranded DNA. When DNA in solution is heated above its melting temperature (usually more than 80 °C), the double-stranded DNA unwinds to form single-stranded DNA. The bases become unstacked and can thus absorb more light. In their native state, the bases of DNA absorb light in the 260-nm wavelength region. When the bases become unstacked, the wavelength of maximum absorbance does not change, but the amount absorbed increases by 37%. A double stranded DNA strand dissociating to two single strands produces a sharp cooperative transition.

Hyperchromicity can be used to track the condition of DNA as temperature changes. The transition/melting temperature (T_{m}) is the temperature where the absorbance of UV light is 50% between the maximum and minimum, i.e. where 50% of the DNA is denatured. A ten fold increase of monovalent cation concentration increases the temperature by 16.6 °C.

The hyperchromic effect is the striking increase in absorbance of DNA upon denaturation. The two strands of DNA are bound together mainly by the stacking interactions, hydrogen bonds and hydrophobic effect between the complementary bases. The hydrogen bond limits the resonance of the aromatic ring so the absorbance of the sample is limited as well. When the DNA double helix is treated with denatured agents, the interaction force holding the double helical structure is disrupted. The double helix then separates into two single strands which are in the random coiled conformation. At this time, the base-base interaction will be reduced, increasing the UV absorbance of DNA solution because many bases are in free form and do not form hydrogen bonds with complementary bases. As a result, the absorbance for single-stranded DNA will be 37% higher than that for double stranded DNA at the same concentration.

== See also ==
- Bathochromic shift
- Chromism
