= Deoxyribonuclease I =

Protein-coding gene in the species Homo sapiens

DNASE1
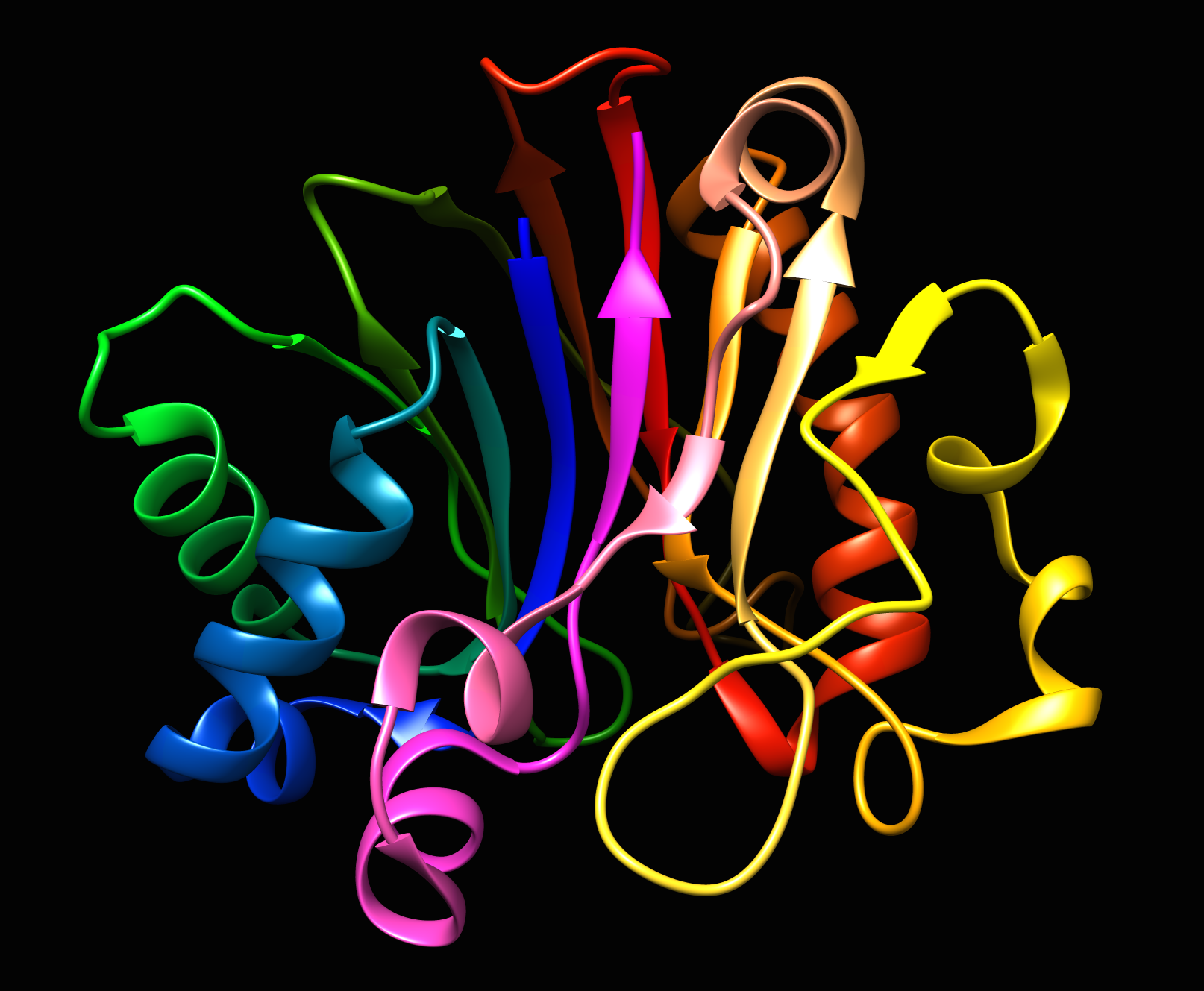

Identifiers
- Aliases: DNASE1, DNL1, DRNI, deoxyribonuclease I, deoxyribonuclease 1
- External IDs: OMIM: 125505; MGI: 103157; GeneCards: DNASE1
Available structures
PDB	Human UniProt search: PDBe RCSB
PDB	List of PDB id codes 4AWN
Enzyme activity
EC #	BRENDA	ExPASy	KEGG	MetaCyc
3.1.21.1	↗	↗	↗	↗

Gene location (Human)
Chr.	Chromosome 16 (human)
Band	16p13.3	Start	3,611,728 bp
Band	16p13.3	End	3,680,143 bp

Gene location (Mouse)
Chr.	Chromosome 16 (mouse)
Band	16 A1|16 2.37 cM	Start	3,854,806 bp
Band	16 A1|16 2.37 cM	End	3,857,888 bp
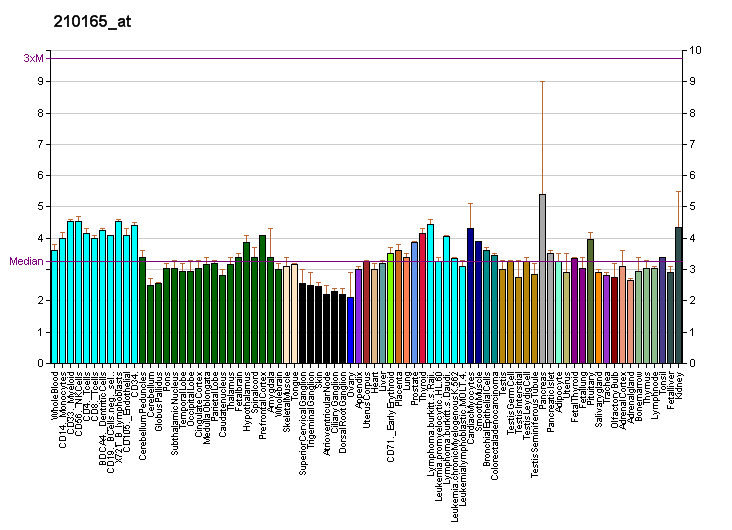
RNA expression pattern
Bgee	Human / Mouse (ortholog); Top expressed in: duodenum; jejunal mucosa; tendon of biceps brachii; body of pancreas; buccal mucosa cell; mucosa of ileum; anterior pituitary; body of stomach; granulocyte; right hemisphere of cerebellum / Top expressed in: parotid gland; lacrimal gland; submandibular gland; right kidney; vestibular membrane of cochlear duct; human kidney; stria vascularis; jejunum; proximal tubule; vestibular sensory epithelium; More reference expression data
BioGPS	More reference expression data
Gene ontology
Molecular function	nuclease activity; endonuclease activity; deoxyribonuclease I activity; actin binding; protein binding; hydrolase activity; deoxyribonuclease activity; DNA binding
Cellular component	extracellular region; extracellular exosome; nuclear envelope; nucleus
Biological process	DNA catabolic process; nucleic acid phosphodiester bond hydrolysis; apoptotic process; DNA catabolic process, endonucleolytic; neutrophil activation involved in immune response; regulation of acute inflammatory response; regulation of neutrophil mediated cytotoxicity
Sources:Amigo / QuickGO
Orthologs
Databases	NCBI: entry; OMA: entry
Species	Human	Mouse
Entrez	1773	13419
Ensembl	ENSG00000213918	ENSMUSG00000005980
UniProt	P24855	n/a
RefSeq (mRNA)	NM_005223; NM_001351825; NM_001387135; NM_001387139; NM_001387140 NM_001387141	NM_010061; NM_001357143
RefSeq (protein)	NP_005214; NP_001338754	n/a
Location (UCSC)	Chr 16: 3.61 – 3.68 Mb	Chr 16: 3.85 – 3.86 Mb
PubMed search
- Wikidata
View/Edit Human	View/Edit Mouse

Deoxyribonuclease I (usually called DNase I), is an enzyme that in humans is encoded by the gene DNASE1. As its name suggests, DNase I functions as a DNase, which means it is involved in cleaving and breaking down DNA. This type of DNase is found in blood and secreted into various types of bodily fluid. A recombinant form of this enzyme, called dornase alfa, is used in the treatment of cystic fibrosis by making the DNA-filled mucus less viscous.

DNase I is an endonuclease of the DNase family that cleaves DNA preferentially at phosphodiester linkages adjacent to a pyrimidine nucleotide, yielding 5'-phosphate-terminated polynucleotides with a free hydroxyl group on position 3', on average producing tetranucleotides. It acts on single-stranded DNA, double-stranded DNA, and chromatin. In addition to its role as a waste-management endonuclease, it has been suggested to be one of the deoxyribonucleases responsible for DNA fragmentation during apoptosis.

DNase I binds to the cytoskeletal protein actin. It binds actin monomers with very high (sub-nanomolar) affinity and actin polymers with lower affinity. The function of this interaction is unclear. However, since actin-bound DNase I is enzymatically inactive, the DNase-actin complex might be a storage form of DNase I that prevents damage of the genetic information. This protein is stored in the zymogen granules of the nuclear envelope and functions by cleaving DNA in an endonucleolytic manner.

At least six autosomal codominant alleles of the gene DNASE 1 have been characterized, DNASE1*1 through DNASE1*6, with the sequence of DNASE1*2 represented in this record. Mutations in this gene, as well as factor inactivating its enzyme product, have been associated with systemic lupus erythematosus (SLE), an autoimmune disease. A recombinant form of this protein is used to treat one of the symptoms of cystic fibrosis by hydrolyzing the extracellular DNA in sputum and reducing its viscosity. Alternate transcriptional splice variants of this gene have been observed but have not been thoroughly characterized.

== In genomics ==
In genomics, DNase I hypersensitive sites are thought to be characterized by open, accessible chromatin; therefore, a DNase I sensitivity assay is a widely used methodology in genomics for identifying which regions of the genome are likely to contain active genes

== DNase I Sequence Specificity ==
It has been recently reported that DNase I shows some levels of sequence specificity that may depend on experimental conditions. In contrast to other enzymes which have high substrate specificity, DNase I certainly does not cleave with an absolute sequence specificity. However, cleavage at sites that contain C or G at their 3' end is less efficient.
