= DNASE1L2 =

Protein-coding gene in the species Homo sapiens

Identifiers
- Aliases: DNASE1L2, DNAS1L2, deoxyribonuclease I-like 2, deoxyribonuclease 1 like 2
- External IDs: OMIM: 602622; MGI: 1913955; HomoloGene: 74391; GeneCards: DNASE1L2; OMA:DNASE1L2 - orthologs

Gene location (Human)
Chr.	Chromosome 16 (human)
Band	16p13.3	Start	2,235,816 bp
Band	16p13.3	End	2,238,711 bp

Gene location (Mouse)
Chr.	Chromosome 17 (mouse)
Band	17|17 A3.3	Start	24,659,055 bp
Band	17|17 A3.3	End	24,662,079 bp
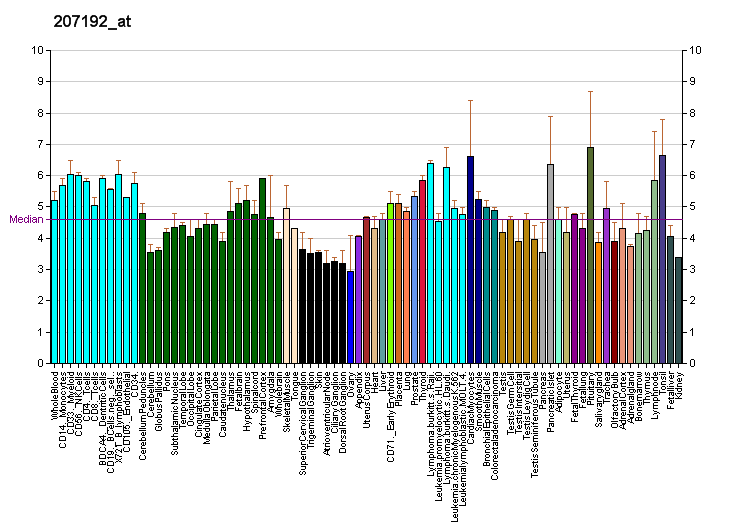
RNA expression pattern
Bgee	Human / Mouse (ortholog); Top expressed in: skin of abdomen; skin of leg; skin of arm; right hemisphere of cerebellum; right lobe of thyroid gland; left lobe of thyroid gland; right frontal lobe; skin of thigh; vulva; Brodmann area 9 / Top expressed in: lip; esophagus; transitional epithelium of urinary bladder; skin of back; skin of external ear; umbilical cord; neural layer of retina; hair follicle; granulocyte; skin of abdomen; More reference expression data
BioGPS	More reference expression data
Gene ontology
Molecular function	DNA binding; calcium ion binding; endonuclease activity; nuclease activity; hydrolase activity; deoxyribonuclease activity; metal ion binding; deoxyribonuclease I activity
Cellular component	cytoplasm; extracellular region; nucleus
Biological process	hair follicle development; DNA metabolic process; DNA catabolic process; corneocyte development; nucleic acid phosphodiester bond hydrolysis; DNA catabolic process, endonucleolytic
Sources:Amigo / QuickGO
Orthologs
Species	Human	Mouse
Entrez	1775	66705
Ensembl	ENSG00000167968	ENSMUSG00000024136
UniProt	Q92874	Q9D1G0
RefSeq (mRNA)	NM_001301680; NM_001374	NM_025718
RefSeq (protein)	NP_001288609; NP_001365	NP_079994
Location (UCSC)	Chr 16: 2.24 – 2.24 Mb	Chr 17: 24.66 – 24.66 Mb
PubMed search
- Wikidata
View/Edit Human	View/Edit Mouse

Deoxyribonuclease-1-like 2 is an enzyme that in humans is encoded by the DNASE1L2 gene.
