= Phosphatase =

Enzyme which catalyzes the removal of a phosphate group from a molecule

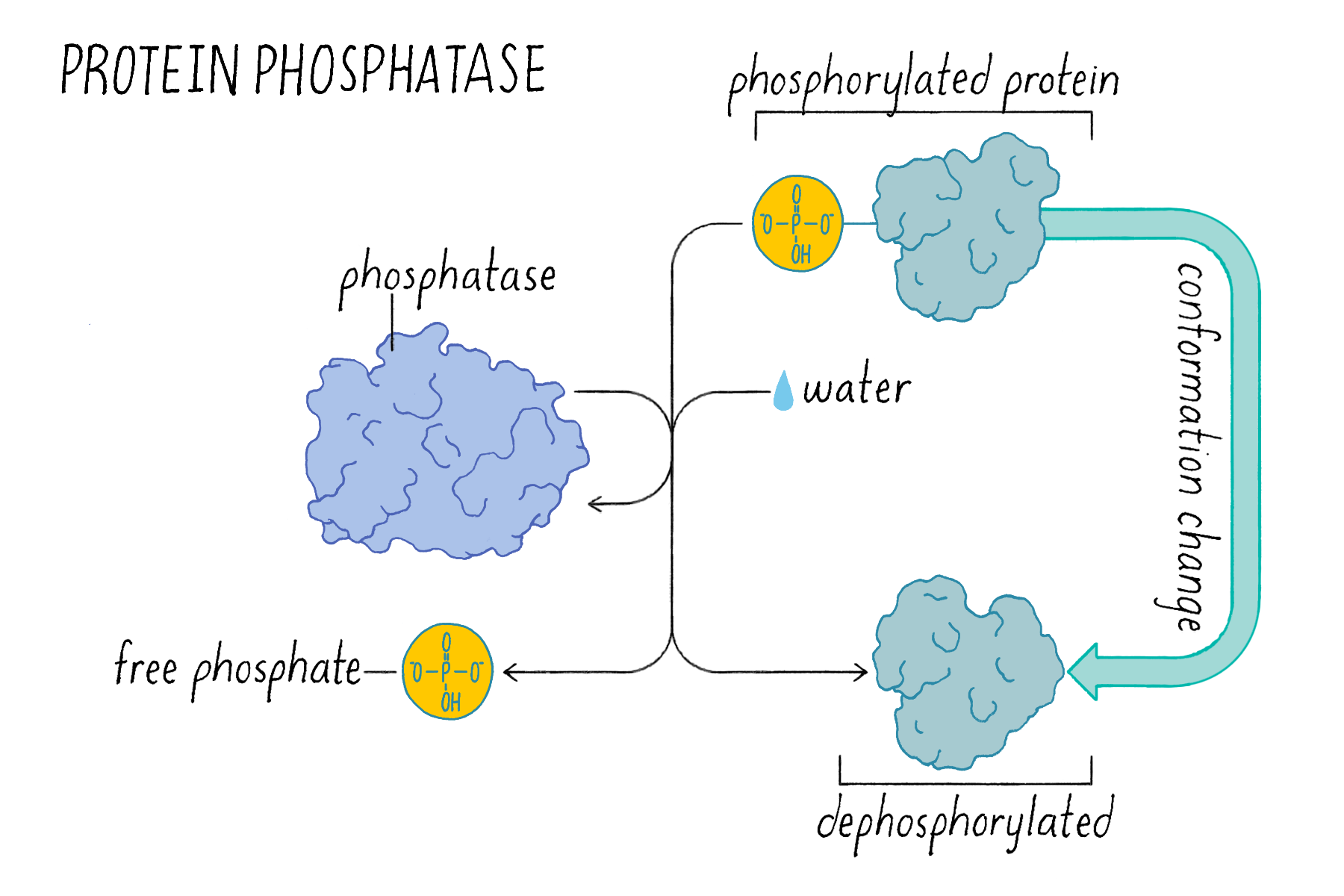
An enzyme (shown in yellow) that cleaves and removes a phosphate group attached to an amino acid (serine, threonine, tyrosine, or histidine) on a protein.

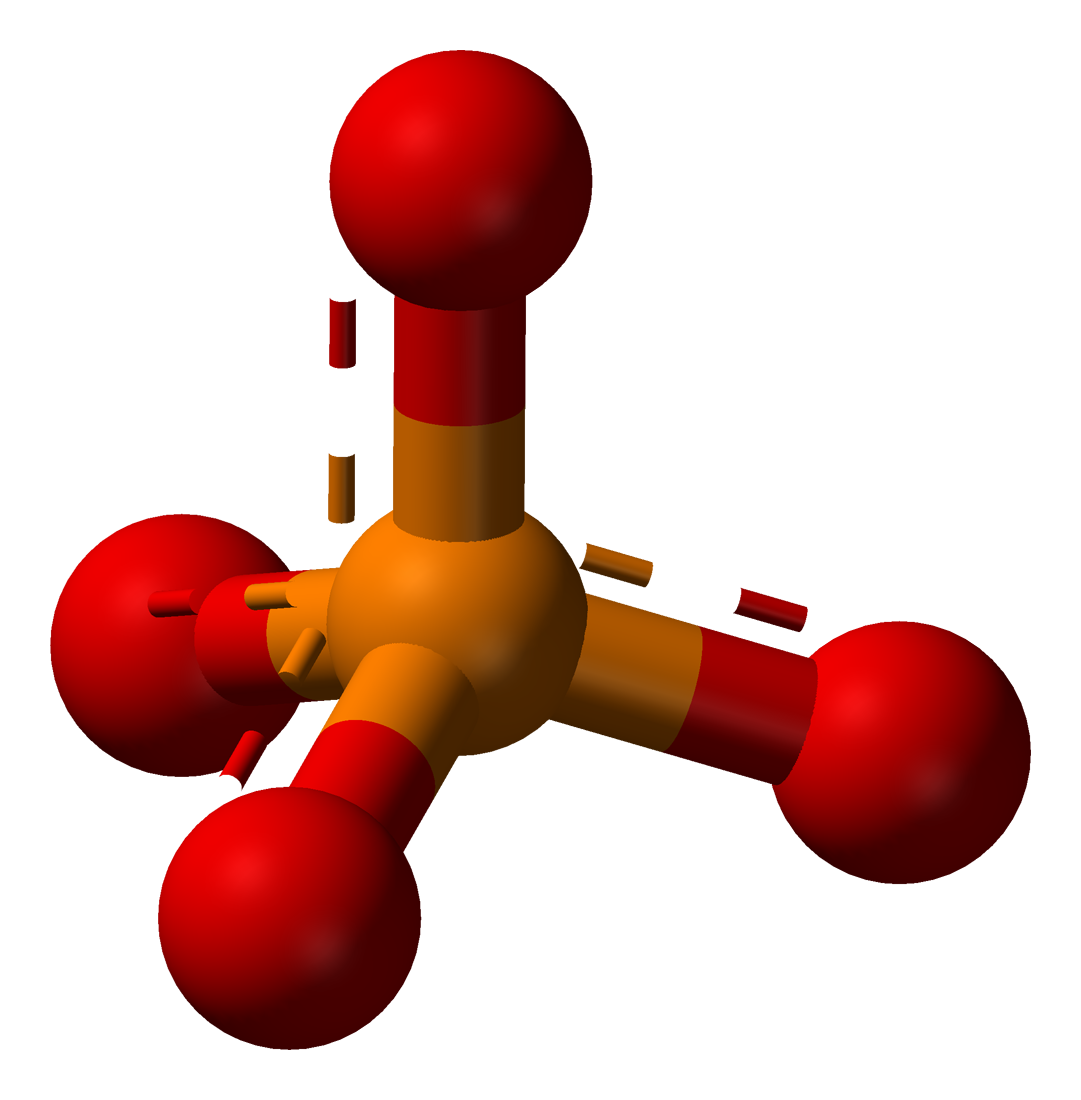
A ball and stick model of a phosphate anion

In biochemistry, a phosphatase is an enzyme that uses water to cleave a phosphoric acid monoester into a phosphate ion and an alcohol. Because a phosphatase enzyme catalyzes the hydrolysis of its substrate, it is a subcategory of hydrolases. Phosphatase enzymes are essential to many biological functions, because phosphorylation (e.g. by protein kinases) and dephosphorylation (by phosphatases) serve diverse roles in cellular regulation and signaling. Whereas phosphatases remove phosphate groups from molecules, kinases catalyze the transfer of phosphate groups to molecules from ATP. Together, kinases and phosphatases direct a form of post-translational modification that is essential to the cell's regulatory network.

Phosphatase enzymes are not to be confused with phosphorylase enzymes, which catalyze the transfer of a phosphate group from hydrogen phosphate to an acceptor. Due to their prevalence in cellular regulation, phosphatases are an area of interest for pharmaceutical research.

== Biochemistry ==
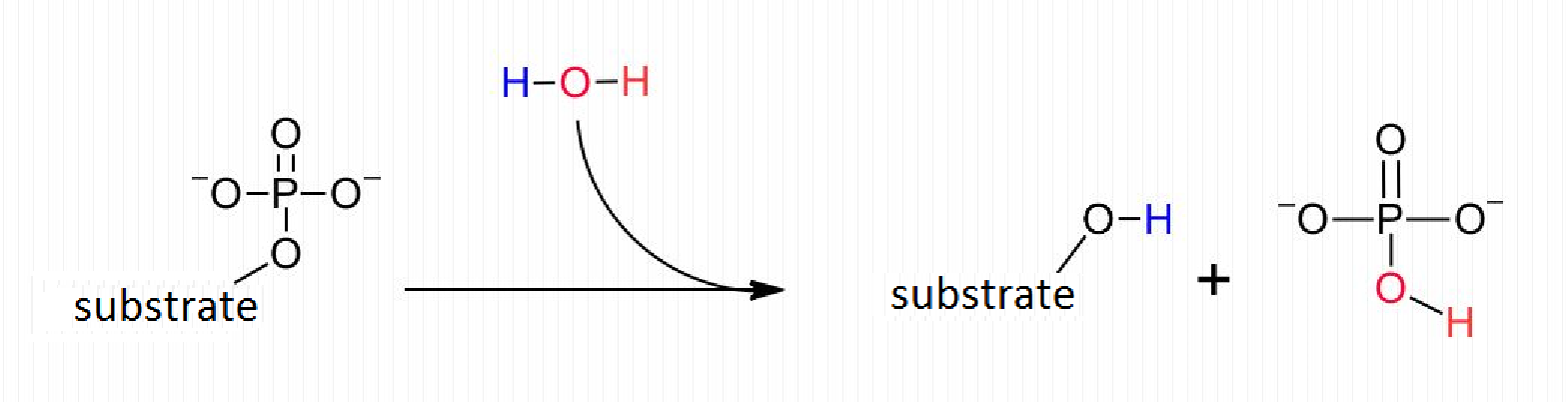
The general reaction catalyzed by a phosphatase enzyme

Phosphatases catalyze the hydrolysis of a phosphomonoester, removing a phosphate moiety from the substrate. Water is split in the reaction, with the -OH group attaching to the phosphate ion, and the H+ protonating the hydroxyl group of the other product. The net result of the reaction is the destruction of a phosphomonoester and the creation of both a phosphate ion and a molecule with a free hydroxyl group.

Phosphatases are able to dephosphorylate seemingly different sites on their substrates with great specificity. Identifying the "phosphatase code," that is, the mechanisms and rules that govern substrate recognition for phosphatases, is still a work in progress, but the first comparative analysis of all the protein phosphatases encoded across nine eukaryotic 'phosphatome' genomes is now available. Studies reveal that so called "docking interactions" play a significant role in substrate binding. A phosphatase recognizes and interacts with various motifs (elements of secondary structure) on its substrate; these motifs bind with low affinity to docking sites on the phosphatase, which are not contained within its active site. Although each individual docking interaction is weak, many interactions occur simultaneously, conferring a cumulative effect on binding specificity. Docking interactions can also allosterically regulate phosphatases and thus influence their catalytic activity.

== Functions ==
In contrast to kinases, phosphatase enzymes recognize and catalyze a wider array of substrates and reactions. For example, in humans, Ser/Thr kinases outnumber Ser/Thr phosphatases by a factor of ten. To some extent, this disparity results from incomplete knowledge of the human phosphatome, that is, the complete set of phosphatases expressed in a cell, tissue, or organism. Many phosphatases have yet to be discovered, and for numerous known phosphatases, a substrate has yet to be identified. However, among well-studied phosphatase/kinase pairs, phosphatases exhibit greater variety than their kinase counterparts in both form and function; this may result from the lesser degree of conservation among phosphatases.

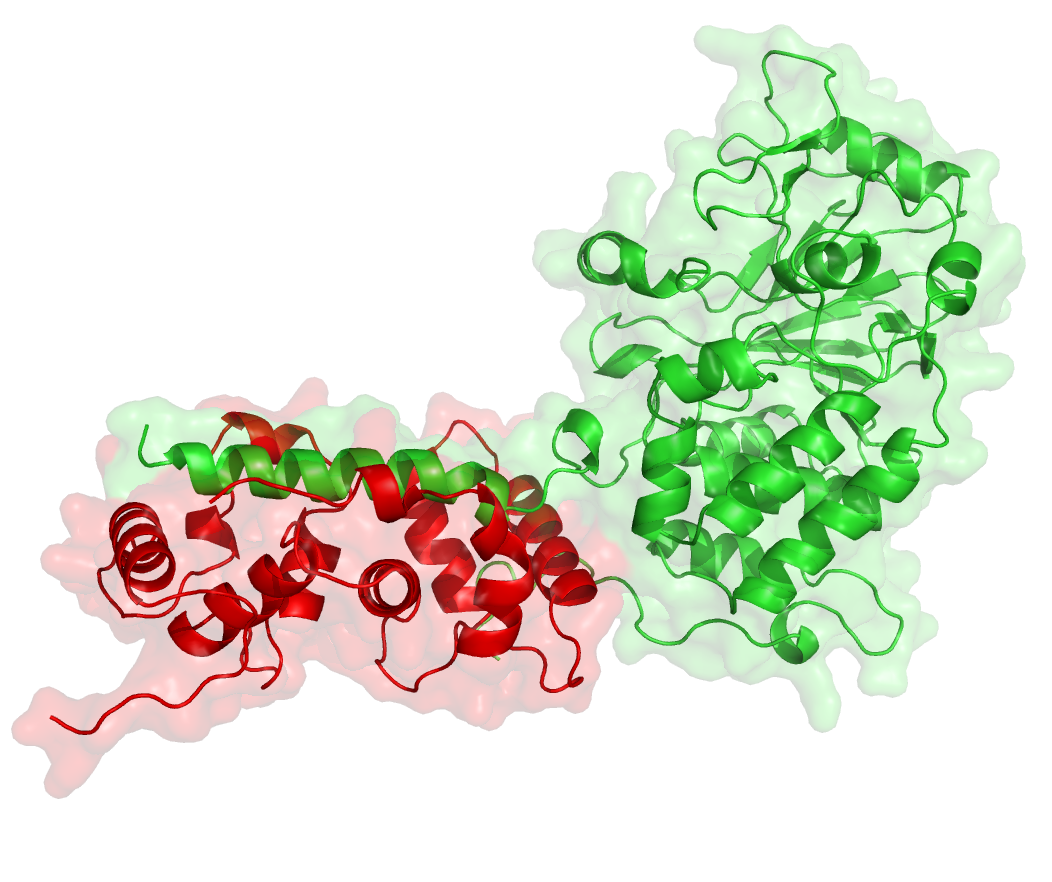
Calcineurin (PP2B) is a protein phosphatase enzyme involved in immune system function.

=== Distinctions ===
Phosphatases should not be confused with phosphorylases, which add phosphate groups.

Name	Class	Reaction	Notes
Phosphorylase	Transferase (EC 2.4, 2.7.7)	A−B + H−OP ⇌ A−OP + H−B	transfer group = A = glycosyl/nucleotidyl group
Phosphatase	Hydrolase (EC 3)	P−B + H−OH ⇌ P−OH + H−B	
Kinase	Transferase (EC 2.7.1-2.7.4)	P−B + H−A ⇌ P−A + H−B	transfer group = P
P = phosphonate group, OP = phosphate group, H−OP or P−OH = inorganic phosphate

=== Protein phosphatases ===
A protein phosphatase is an enzyme that dephosphorylates an amino acid residue of its protein substrate. Whereas protein kinases act as signaling molecules by phosphorylating proteins, phosphatases remove the phosphate group, which is essential if the system of intracellular signaling is to be able to reset for future use. The tandem work of kinases and phosphatases constitute a significant element of the cell's regulatory network. Phosphorylation (and dephosphorylation) is among the most common modes of posttranslational modification in proteins, and it is estimated that, at any given time, up to 30% of all proteins are phosphorylated. Two notable protein phosphatases are PP2A and PP2B. PP2A is involved in multiple regulatory processes, such as DNA replication, metabolism, transcription, and development. PP2B, also called calcineurin, is involved in the proliferation of T cells; because of this, it is the target of some drugs that seek to suppress the immune system.

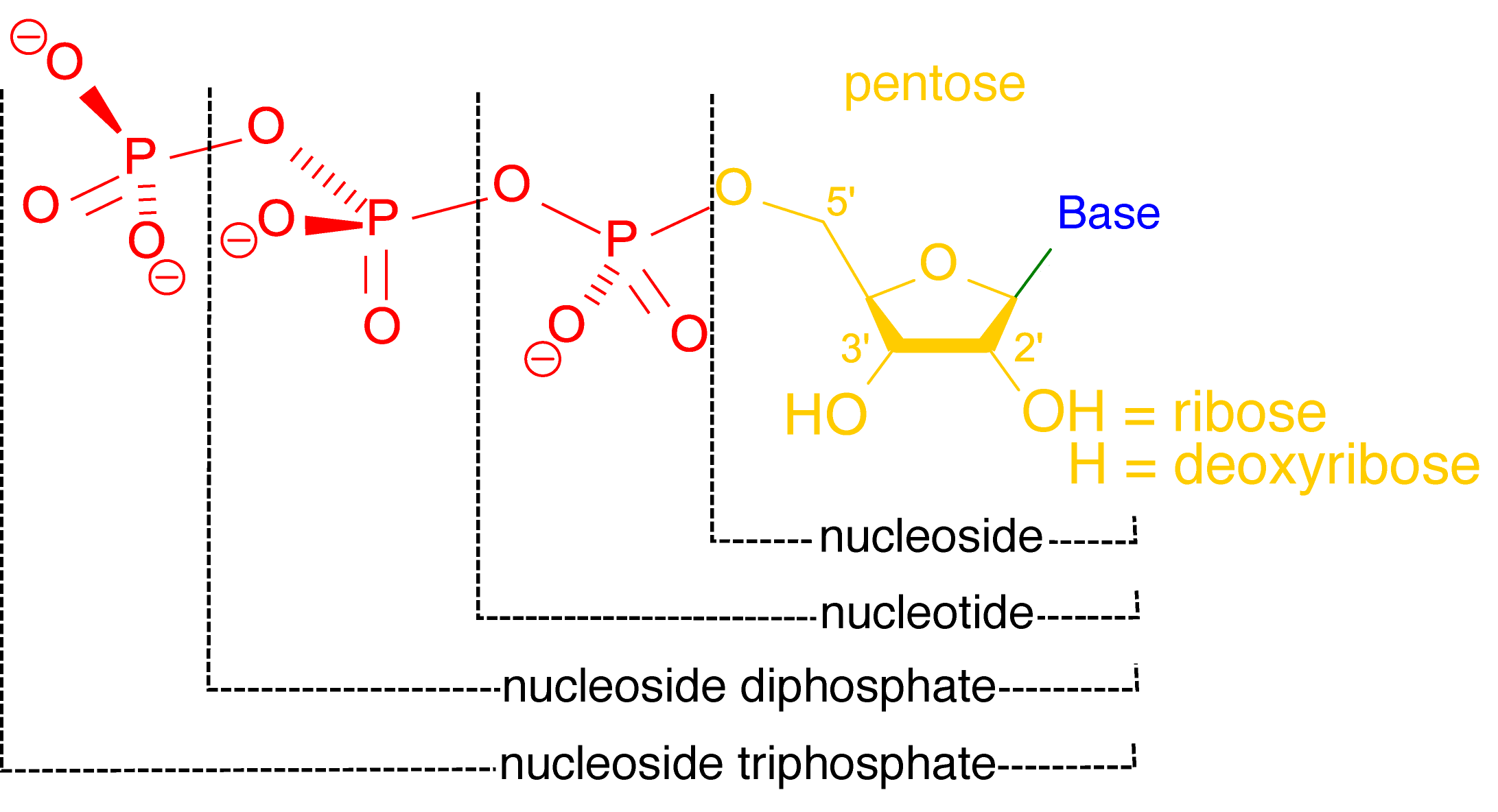
Nucleosides and nucleotides differ by one phosphate, which is cleaved from nucleotides by nucleotidases.

=== Nucleotidases ===
A nucleotidase is an enzyme that catalyzes the hydrolysis of a nucleotide, forming a nucleoside and a phosphate ion. Nucleotidases are essential for cellular homeostasis, because they are partially responsible for maintaining a balanced ratio of nucleotides to nucleosides. Some nucleotidases function outside the cell, creating nucleosides that can be transported into the cell and used to regenerate nucleotides via salvage pathways. Inside the cell, nucleotidases may help to maintain energy levels under stress conditions. A cell deprived of oxygen and nutrients may catabolize more nucleotides to boost levels of nucleoside triphosphates such as ATP, the primary energy currency of the cell.

=== In gluconeogenesis ===
Phosphatases can also act on carbohydrates, such as intermediates in gluconeogenesis. Gluconeogenesis is a biosynthetic pathway wherein glucose is created from noncarbohydrate precursors; the pathway is essential because many tissues can only derive energy from glucose. Two phosphatases, glucose-6-phosphatase and fructose-1,6-bisphosphatase, catalyze irreversible steps in gluconeogenesis. Each cleaves a phosphate group from a six-carbon sugar phosphate intermediate.

== Classification ==
Within the larger class of phosphatase, the Enzyme Commission recognizes 104 distinct enzyme families. Phosphatases are classified by substrate specificity and sequence homology in catalytic domains. Despite their classification into over one hundred families, all phosphatases still catalyze the same general hydrolysis reaction.

In in-vitro experiments, phosphatase enzymes seem to recognize many different substrates, and one substrate may be recognized by many different phosphatases. However, when experiments have been carried out in-vivo, phosphatase enzymes have been shown to be incredibly specific. In some cases, a protein phosphatase (i.e. one defined by its recognition of protein substrates) can catalyze the dephosphorylation of nonprotein substrates. Similarly, dual-specificity tyrosine phosphatases can dephosphorylate not only tyrosine residues, but also serine residues. Thus, one phosphatase can exhibit the qualities of multiple phosphatase families.

== See also ==
- Acid phosphatase
- Alkaline phosphatase
- Endonuclease/Exonuclease/phosphatase family
- Kinase
- Phosphatome
- Phosphotransferase
- Protein phosphatase
- Protein phosphatase 2 (PP2A)
