= Protein methods =

Techniques used to study proteins

Protein methods are the techniques used to study proteins. There are experimental methods for studying proteins (e.g., for detecting proteins, for isolating and purifying proteins, and for characterizing the structure and function of proteins, often requiring that the protein first be purified). Computational methods typically use computer programs to analyze proteins. However, many experimental methods (e.g., mass spectrometry) require computational analysis of the raw data.

== Genetic methods ==
Experimental analysis of proteins typically requires expression and purification of proteins. Expression is achieved by manipulating DNA that encodes the protein(s) of interest. Hence, protein analysis usually requires DNA methods, especially cloning. Some examples of genetic methods include conceptual translation, Site-directed mutagenesis, using a fusion protein, and matching allele with disease states. Most proteins have never been directly sequenced. However, their sequence is known from translating their coding sequences into amino acids (see genetic code).

Site-directed mutagenesis selectively introduces mutations that change the structure or function of a protein. The function of parts of proteins can be better understood by studying the change in phenotype as a result of this change. Deep mutational scanning has been used to mutagenize and change amino acids in a protein on a large scale. For instance, deep mutational scanning of dihydrofolate reductase (DHFR) has examined 2696 amino acid changes and found large fractions of them to be either neutral, positive, or negative when tested for growth rates.

Fusion proteins are made by inserting protein tags, such as the His-tag, to produce a modified protein that is easier to track. An example of this would be GFP-Snf2H which consists of a protein bound to a green fluorescent protein to form a hybrid protein.

Phenotyping. Protein coding alleles can be identified as being associated with disease states, such as in calculation of LOD scores.

== Protein extraction from tissues ==
Protein extraction from tissues with tough extracellular matrices (e.g., biopsy samples, venous tissues, cartilage, skin) is often achieved in a laboratory setting by impact pulverization in liquid nitrogen. Samples are frozen in liquid nitrogen and subsequently subjected to impact or mechanical grinding. As water in the samples becomes very brittle at these temperature, the samples are often reduced to a collection of fine fragments, which can then be dissolved for protein extraction. Stainless steel devices known as tissue pulverizers are sometimes used for this purpose. Advantages of these devices include high levels of protein extraction from small, valuable samples, disadvantages include low-level cross-over contamination.

== Protein purification ==
Protein purification is a critical process in molecular biology and biochemistry, aimed at isolating a specific protein from a complex mixture, such as cell lysates or tissue extracts. The goal is to obtain the protein in a pure form that retains its biological activity for further study, including functional assays, structural analysis, or therapeutic applications. The purification process typically involves several steps, including cell lysis, protein extraction, and a combination of chromatographic and electrophoretic techniques.

=== Protein isolation ===
Protein isolation refers to the extraction of proteins from biological samples, which can include tissues, cells, or other materials. The process often begins with cell lysis, where the cellular membranes are disrupted to release proteins into a solution. This can be achieved through physical methods (e.g., sonication, homogenization) or chemical methods (e.g., detergents, enzymes). Following lysis, the mixture is usually clarified by centrifugation to remove cell debris and insoluble material, allowing soluble proteins to be collected for further purification.

== Chromatography methods ==
Chromatography is a widely used technique for protein purification, allowing for the separation of proteins based on various properties, including charge, size, and binding affinity. Here are the main types of chromatography used in protein purification:

=== Ion Exchange Chromatography ===
Ion exchange chromatography separates proteins based on their net charge at a given pH. The stationary phase consists of charged resin beads that interact with oppositely charged proteins. As the sample passes through the column, proteins bind to the resin while unbound proteins are washed away. By gradually changing the ionic strength or pH of the elution buffer, bound proteins can be released in a controlled manner, allowing for effective separation.

=== Size-Exclusion Chromatography (Gel Filtration) ===
Size-exclusion chromatography separates proteins based on their size. The stationary phase is composed of porous beads that allow smaller molecules to enter the pores while larger molecules pass around them. As a result, larger proteins elute first, followed by smaller ones. This method is particularly useful for desalting or removing small contaminants from protein samples.

=== Affinity Chromatography ===
Affinity chromatography exploits the specific interactions between proteins and their ligands. A target protein is captured on a column containing a ligand that specifically binds to it, such as an antibody, enzyme substrate, or metal ion. After washing away non-specifically bound proteins, the target protein is eluted using a solution that disrupts the protein-ligand interaction. This method provides high specificity and is often used for purifying recombinant proteins that have affinity tags.

=== Protein Extraction and Solubilization ===
Protein extraction involves isolating proteins from complex biological samples while maintaining their functionality. It often requires a careful choice of extraction buffers that contain salts, detergents, or stabilizers to preserve protein structure and activity. The solubilization step is crucial for proteins that are membrane-bound or insoluble in aqueous solutions. Detergents such as Triton X-100 or SDS can be used to solubilize proteins from membranes by disrupting lipid bilayers, allowing for effective extraction.

=== Concentrating protein solutions ===
After initial purification, protein solutions may need to be concentrated to increase the protein's concentration for downstream applications. This can be achieved through various methods, including ultrafiltration, which uses semi-permeable membranes to separate proteins from smaller molecules and salts, and lyophilization (freeze-drying), which removes water and allows proteins to be stored in a stable form. Precipitation methods, such as ammonium sulfate precipitation, can also be employed to concentrate proteins by altering the solubility conditions.

=== Gel electrophoresis ===
Gel electrophoresis is a powerful analytical technique used to separate proteins based on their size and charge. Proteins are loaded onto a gel matrix, typically made of polyacrylamide or agarose, and an electric current is applied. The negatively charged proteins migrate towards the positive electrode, with smaller proteins moving faster through the gel matrix than larger ones. This method is crucial for assessing the purity and size of protein samples.

==== Gel electrophoresis under denaturing conditions ====
Denaturing gel electrophoresis, commonly performed using SDS-PAGE (sodium dodecyl sulfate-polyacrylamide gel electrophoresis), involves treating proteins with SDS, a detergent that denatures proteins and imparts a uniform negative charge. This allows proteins to be separated solely based on their molecular weight, providing a clear picture of the protein composition of a sample.

==== Gel electrophoresis under non-denaturing conditions ====
Non-denaturing gel electrophoresis allows proteins to maintain their native structure while being separated. This method is useful for studying protein-protein interactions and enzyme activities. Proteins migrate through the gel based on their size and charge, but their functional properties remain intact, making it ideal for analyzing native protein complexes.

==== 2D gel electrophoresis ====
2D gel electrophoresis combines isoelectric focusing (IEF) and SDS-PAGE to achieve a high-resolution separation of proteins. In the first dimension, proteins are separated based on their isoelectric points (pI), while in the second dimension, they are separated by molecular weight. This technique allows for the analysis of complex protein mixtures, facilitating the identification of differentially expressed proteins in various conditions.

==== Electrofocusing ====
Electrofocusing is a specialized technique that separates proteins based on their isoelectric points in a pH gradient. As an electric field is applied, proteins migrate until they reach the point where their net charge is zero, effectively focusing them into narrow bands. This method provides high resolution and is often used in combination with other techniques for comprehensive protein analysis.

== Detecting proteins ==
In some applications, it is necessary to measure the total amount of protein present, rather than the levels of one particular protein. In these cases nonspecific protein assays can be used to quantitate the amount of protein in a sample. Common nonspecific protein assays include the Warburg–Christian method, Kjeldahl method, Lowry assay, and Bradford assay. Many of these rely on the spectrophotometric properties of proteins themselves or in complex with various dyes or reagents. For example, the Bradford Assay exploits the absorbance properties of Coomassie brilliant blue G-250 dye. When free of protein, the dye is red but once bound to protein it turns blue. The Kjeldahl method, in contrast, does not use any dye and is instead a titrimetric assay, sensitive to the nitrogen content in the sample, which correlates with protein content. These assays vary widely in sensitivity, specificity to proteins over other compounds in the sample, and cost.

== Protein structures ==
- X-ray crystallography
- Protein NMR
- Cryo-electron microscopy
- Small-angle X-ray scattering
- Circular Dichroism

== Interactions involving proteins ==
- Protein footprinting

=== Protein–protein interactions ===
- (Yeast) two-hybrid system
- Protein-fragment complementation assay
- Co-immunoprecipitation
- Affinity purification and mass spectrometry
- Proximity ligation assay
- Proximity labeling

=== Protein–DNA interactions ===
- ChIP-on-chip
- Chip-sequencing
- DamID
- Microscale thermophoresis

=== Protein–RNA interactions ===
- Toeprinting assay
- TCP-seq

== Computational methods ==
- Molecular dynamics
- Protein structure prediction
- Protein sequence alignment (sequence comparison, including BLAST)
- Protein structural alignment
- Protein ontology (see gene ontology)

== Other methods ==
- Hydrogen–deuterium exchange
- Mass spectrometry
- Protein sequencing
- Protein synthesis
- Proteomics
- Peptide mass fingerprinting
- Ligand binding assay
- Eastern blotting
- Metabolic labeling
  - Heavy isotope labeling
  - Radioactive isotope labeling

== See also ==
- CSH Protocols
- Current Protocols

== Bibliography ==
- Daniel M. Bollag, Michael D. Rozycki and Stuart J. Edelstein. (1996.) Protein Methods, 2 ed., Wiley Publishers. ISBN 0-471-11837-0.
