= Howard Chang =

Howard Chang may refer to:

- Howard F. Chang (born 1960), American legal academic
- Howard Y. Chang (born 1972), Taiwanese-born American physician-scientist
