= Human Epigenome Project =

Human Epigenome Project (HEP) is a multinational science project, with the stated aim to "identify, catalog, and interpret genome-wide DNA methylation patterns of all human genes in all major tissues". It is financed by government funds as well as private investment, via a consortium of genetic research organisations.

The call for such a project was widely suggested and supported by cancer research scientists from all over the world.

== Consortium ==
The HEP consortium is made up of the following organizations:

- The Wellcome Trust Sanger Institute — UK
- Epigenomics AG — Germany/USA
- The Centre National de Génotypage — France

== See also ==
- Epigenome
