= Ryszard Maleszka =

Australian academic

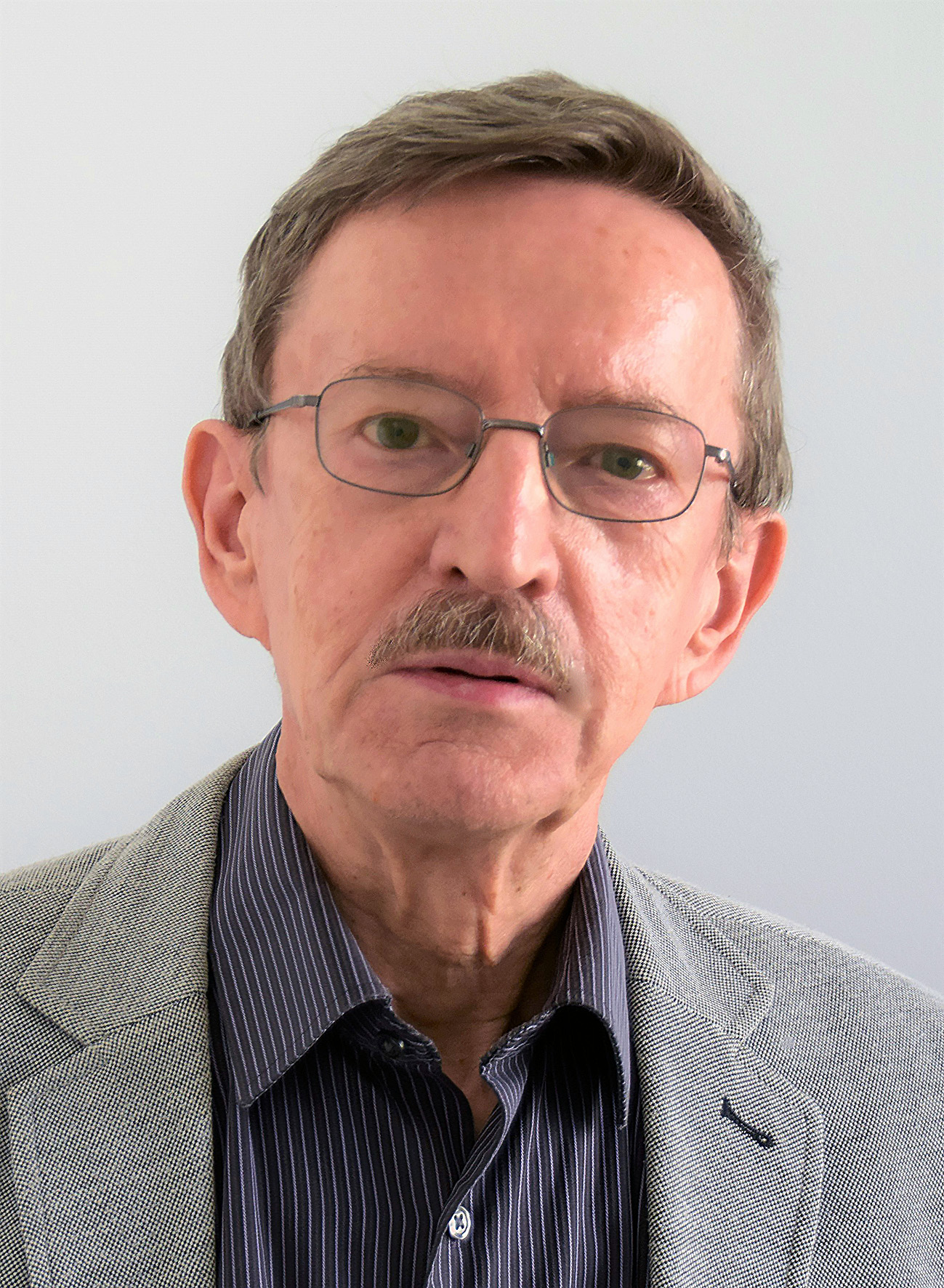
- Born: January 14, 1949 (age 77); Warsaw, Poland
- Education: University of Warsaw
- Known for: Genomics; Epigenetics; Social insects; Molecular biology
- Scientific career
- Fields: Biology, genetics
- Workplaces: Australian National University

Ryszard Maleszka (born January 14, 1949) is a Polish Australian academic and researcher. He received his MSc and PhD from the Department of Genetics at the University of Warsaw and completed his postdoctoral work at the National Research Council in Canada. He moved to Australia in 1987 after receiving a scholarship from the Australian National University in Canberra, where he established an independent laboratory in the Research School of Biological Sciences. He became emeritus professor in 2019.

Maleszka has studied the link between genes and phenotype, transitioning from genetics-based single-gene approaches to genomics, and to epigenomics. He has retained an emphasis on developmental problems and exploited relevant systems with measurable phenotypic endpoints such as yeast, Drosophila, and the honey bee.

A pioneer in insect genomics in Australia, Maleszka conducted research into epigenetic regulation of phenotypic and behavioural polymorphisms using the honey bee model. His group has researched the role of non-genetic factors play in linking environment with gene expression. Maleszka has also worked on genes involved in brain plasticity.

His works has been published in scientific journals, contributed chapters to several books, and he co-invented two patents. His work has been cited, and featured in editorial commentaries.

== Selected publications ==
- Maleszka, R. (8 August 2025). "Is the concept of mammalian epigenetic clocks universal and applicable to invertebrates?" Frontiers in Genetics. 16. doi.org/10.3389/fgene.2025.1633921
- Kucharski, R.; Maleszka, J.; Foret, S.; Maleszka, R. (28 March 2008). "Nutritional Control of Reproductive Status in Honeybees via DNA Methylation". Science. 319 (5871): 1827–1830. Bibcode:2008Sci...319.1827K. doi:10.1126/science.1153069. PMID 18339900.
- Kucharski, Robert; Ellis, Nancy; Jurkowski, Tomasz P.; Hurd, Paul J.; Maleszka, Ryszard (17 November 2023). "The PWWP domain and the evolution of unique DNA methylation toolkits in Hymenoptera". iScience. 26 (11). Bibcode:2023iSci...26j8193K. doi:10.1016/j.isci.2023.108193. ISSN 2589-0042. PMC 10618690. PMID 37920666.
- Forêt, Sylvain; Maleszka, Ryszard (1 November 2006). "Function and evolution of a gene family encoding odorant binding-like proteins in a social insect, the honey bee (Apis mellifera)". Genome Research. 16 (11): 1404–1413. doi:10.1101/gr.5075706. ISSN 1088-9051. PMC 1626642. PMID 17065610.
- Miklos, George L. Gabor; Maleszka, Ryszard (May 2004). "Microarray reality checks in the context of a complex disease". Nature Biotechnology. 22 (5): 615–621. doi:10.1038/nbt965. ISSN 1546-1696. PMID 15122300.
