= William Greenleaf (American scientist) =

American geneticist and biophysicist (born 1979)

William J. Greenleaf
- Born: William James Greenleaf; December 24, 1979 (age 46); Rochester, Minnesota, U.S.
- Education: Harvard University (A.B.); Trinity College, University of Cambridge (Dip. Comp. Sci.); Stanford University (Ph.D.)
- Known for: ATAC-seq
- Awards: NIH Director's Pioneer Award, Damon Runyon Fellowship
- Scientific career
- Fields: Genomics, Epigenomics, Biophysics
- Workplaces: Stanford University
- Thesis: High-resolution, single-molecule measurements of transcription and RNA folding (2008)
- Doctoral advisor: Steven Block
- Other academic advisors: X. Sunney Xie
- Website: Greenleaf Lab

William J. Greenleaf (born December 24, 1979) is an American molecular biologist, biophysicist, and inventor who is a professor of genetics at the Stanford University School of Medicine. His research focuses on high-throughput sequencing and optical microscopy methods for studying gene regulation and chromatin structure. Greenleaf is a co-inventor of ATAC-seq, a widely-used epigenomic method developed in his lab.

== Biography ==
Greenleaf grew up in Rochester, Minnesota. He attended Mayo High School and worked summers as a research assistant at the Mayo Clinic, winning 6th place in the 1998 Westinghouse Science Talent Search for his project on ultrasound-mediated gene transfection. He graduated cum laude with an A.B. in Physics from Harvard University in 2002, followed by a stint as a Gates Cambridge Scholar at Trinity College, University of Cambridge, from which he received a Dip. Comp. Sci. in 2003. Greenleaf then entered the Applied Physics Ph.D. program at Stanford University, where he joined the laboratory of Steven Block and was funded by the NSF GRFP.

Greenleaf was first or co-first author of publications in Nature, Science, and Cell resulting from his Ph.D. work on single-molecule biophysics, an achievement his advisor Block called a "perfect trifecta," or "quadfecta" if one were to include Greenleaf's additional co-first author publication in Physical Review Letters. Greenleaf received his Ph.D. in Applied Physics from Stanford in January 2008. From 2008 to 2011, he worked on methods development for massively parallel sequencing-by-synthesis as a postdoctoral fellow in X. Sunney Xie's lab at Harvard University. In 2011, Greenleaf returned to Stanford as an assistant professor in the Department of Genetics, establishing his own laboratory within the interdisciplinary Beckman Center for Molecular and Genetic Medicine. He was awarded tenure by Stanford in 2017.

== Research ==
During his Ph.D., Greenleaf worked on single-molecule methods for measuring the forces involved in gene transcription and protein folding. With colleagues in the Block lab, he developed an optical trapping system that enabled ångström-resolution measurement of RNA polymerase "stepping" along DNA. Using this system, he developed a method for DNA sequencing based on the observation that, when the concentration of a given nucleotide base is limiting, RNA polymerase pauses for longer amounts of time at sequence positions corresponding to that base.

Greenleaf's lab at Stanford has focused on high-throughput sequencing and optical microscopy methods for studying gene regulation and chromatin structure. In 2013, Greenleaf's lab, in collaboration with the lab of Howard Y. Chang, introduced ATAC-seq, a method for assaying chromatin accessibility genome-wide. ATAC-seq is based on the principle that, in an in vitro transposition reaction, active (open) chromatin is strongly enriched relative to inactive chromatin for transposition by a hyperactive transposase. Additionally, the genomic positions of nucleosomes and bound transcription factors can be inferred from ATAC-seq based on localized "footprints" depleted for transposition relative to surrounding DNA. Since 2019, a collaboration between Greenleaf's lab and the lab of Sergiu P. Pașca has used ATAC-seq to study chromatin dynamics in human brain organoids.

Other work in Greenleaf's lab has centered on single-molecule measurements of biomacromolecular interactions. The lab attracted attention for disassembling and repurposing Illumina DNA sequencers, an effort that enabled large-scale analyses of FLAG epitope binding by anti-FLAG antibodies, target RNA binding by Argonaute proteins, and target DNA binding by CRISPR-associated proteins. In 2024, Greenleaf's lab published a study in Nature describing the development of thermodynamic and kinetic models to quantitatively predict transcription factor binding microstates and relate those microstates to gene expression.

== Biotechnology startups ==
Greenleaf has held several roles with biotech startups. In 2013, Greenleaf co-founded Epinomics, a Stanford biotech spinout, with Chang and two former Stanford students. Epinomics raised venture capital from Lightspeed and Founders Fund and was acquired by 10x Genomics in 2018. In 2019, Greenleaf co-founded Protillion Biosciences, a spinout commercializing proteomics technology developed in his lab. Protillion announced its Series A fundraise, led by ARCH Venture Partners and Illumina Ventures, in December 2022. As of 2026, Greenleaf served as a scientific advisor to Guardant Health and Ultima Genomics.

== Awards and recognition ==
Greenleaf was named an ARCS Scholar in 2006, a Damon Runyon Fellow in 2009, a Rita Allen Scholar in 2011, a Baxter Foundation Faculty Fellow in 2014, and the E. Bright Wilson Prize winner in 2017. He was a Chan Zuckerberg Initiative Fellow from 2017-2023 and has been an Arc Institute Innovation Investigator since 2023.

Greenleaf was one of eight recipients of the 2023 NIH Director's Pioneer Award, presented annually to approximately ten U.S. scientists with "outstanding records of creativity" who "develop pioneering approaches to major challenges in biomedical, social science, and behavioral research."
