= Epigenomics =

Field of study

Epigenomics is the study of the complete set of epigenetic modifications on the genetic material of a cell, known as the epigenome. The field is analogous to genomics and proteomics, which are the study of the genome and proteome of a cell. Epigenetic modifications are reversible modifications on a cell's DNA or histones that affect gene expression without altering the DNA sequence. Epigenomic maintenance is a continuous process and plays an important role in stability of eukaryotic genomes by taking part in crucial biological mechanisms like DNA repair. Plant flavones are said to be inhibiting epigenomic marks that cause cancers. Two of the most characterized epigenetic modifications are DNA methylation and histone modification. Epigenetic modifications play an important role in gene expression and regulation, and are involved in numerous cellular processes such as in differentiation/development and tumorigenesis. The study of epigenetics on a global level has been made possible only recently through the adaptation of genomic high-throughput assays.

== Epigenetics ==
Genomic modifications that alter gene expression that cannot be attributed to modification of the primary DNA sequence and that are heritable mitotically and meiotically are classified as epigenetic modifications. DNA methylation and histone modification are among the best characterized epigenetic processes.

=== DNA methylation ===
The first epigenetic modification to be characterized in depth was DNA methylation. As its name implies, DNA methylation is the process by which a methyl group is added to DNA. The enzymes responsible for catalyzing this reaction are the DNA methyltransferases (DNMTs). While DNA methylation is stable and heritable, it can be reversed by an antagonistic group of enzymes known as DNA de-methylases. In eukaryotes, methylation is most commonly found on the carbon 5 position of cytosine residues (5mC) adjacent to guanine, termed CpG dinucleotides.

DNA methylation patterns vary greatly between species and even within the same organism. The usage of methylation among animals is quite different; with vertebrates exhibiting the highest levels of 5mC and invertebrates more moderate levels of 5mC. Some organisms like Caenorhabditis elegans have not been demonstrated to have 5mC nor a conventional DNA methyltransferase; this would suggest that other mechanisms other than DNA methylation are also involved.

Within an organism, DNA methylation levels can also vary throughout development and by region. For example, in mouse primordial germ cells, a genome wide de-methylation even occurs; by implantation stage, methylation levels return to their previous somatic values. When DNA methylation occurs at promoter regions, the sites of transcription initiation, it has the effect of repressing gene expression. This is in contrast to unmethylated promoter regions which are associated with actively expressed genes.

The mechanism by which DNA methylation represses gene expression is a multi-step process. The distinction between methylated and unmethylated cytosine residues is carried out by specific DNA-binding proteins. Binding of these proteins recruit histone deacetylases (HDACs) enzyme which initiate chromatin remodeling such that the DNA becoming less accessible to transcriptional machinery, such as RNA polymerase, effectively repressing gene expression.

=== Histone modification ===
In eukaryotes, genomic DNA is coiled into protein-DNA complexes called chromatin. Histones, which are the most prevalent type of protein found in chromatin, function to condense the DNA; the net positive charge on histones facilitates their bonding with DNA, which is negatively charged. The basic and repeating units of chromatin, nucleosomes, consist of an octamer of histone proteins (H2A, H2B, H3, and H4) and a 146 bp length of DNA wrapped around it. Nucleosomes and the DNA connecting form a 10 nm diameter chromatin fiber, which can be further condensed.

Chromatin packaging of DNA varies depending on the cell cycle stage and by local DNA region. The degree to which chromatin is condensed is associated with a certain transcriptional state. Unpackaged or loose chromatin is more transcriptionally active than tightly packaged chromatin because it is more accessible to transcriptional machinery. By remodeling chromatin structure and changing the density of DNA packaging, gene expression can thus be modulated.

Chromatin remodeling occurs via post-translational modifications of the N-terminal tails of core histone proteins. The collective set of histone modifications in a given cell is known as the histone code. Many different types of histone modification are known, including: acetylation, methylation, phosphorylation, ubiquitination, SUMOylation, ADP-ribosylation, deamination and proline isomerization; acetylation, methylation, phosphorylation and ubiquitination have been implicated in gene activation whereas methylation, ubiquitination, SUMOylation, deimination and proline isomerization have been implicated in gene repression. Note that several modification types including methylation, phosphorylation and ubiquitination can be associated with different transcriptional states depending on the specific amino acid on the histone being modified. Furthermore, the DNA region where histone modification occurs can also elicit different effects; an example being methylation of the 3rd core histone at lysine residue 36 (H3K36). When H3K36 occurs in the coding sections of a gene, it is associated with gene activation but the opposite is found when it is within the promoter region.

Histone modifications regulate gene expression by two mechanisms: by disruption of the contact between nucleosomes and by recruiting chromatin remodeling ATPases. An example of the first mechanism occurs during the acetylation of lysine terminal tail amino acids, which is catalyzed by histone acetyltransferases (HATs). HATs are part of a multiprotein complex that is recruited to chromatin when activators bind to DNA binding sites. Acetylation effectively neutralizes the basic charge on lysine, which was involved in stabilizing chromatin through its affinity for negatively charged DNA. Acetylated histones therefore favor the dissociation of nucleosomes and thus unwinding of chromatin can occur. Under a loose chromatin state, DNA is more accessible to transcriptional machinery and thus expression is activated. The process can be reversed through removal of histone acetyl groups by deacetylases.

The second process involves the recruitment of chromatin remodeling complexes by the binding of activator molecules to corresponding enhancer regions. The nucleosome remodeling complexes reposition nucleosomes by several mechanisms, enabling or disabling accessibility of transcriptional machinery to DNA. The SWI/SNF protein complex in yeast is one example of a chromatin remodeling complex that regulates the expression of many genes through chromatin remodeling.

== Relation to other genomic fields ==
Epigenomics shares many commonalities with other genomics fields, in both methodology and in its abstract purpose. Epigenomics seeks to identify and characterize epigenetic modifications on a global level, similar to the study of the complete set of DNA in genomics or the complete set of proteins in a cell in proteomics. The logic behind performing epigenetic analysis on a global level is that inferences can be made about epigenetic modifications, which might not otherwise be possible through analysis of specific loci. As in the other genomics fields, epigenomics relies heavily on bioinformatics, which combines the disciplines of biology, mathematics and computer science. However while epigenetic modifications had been known and studied for decades, it is through these advancements in bioinformatics technology that have allowed analyses on a global scale. Many current techniques still draw on older methods, often adapting them to genomic assays as is described in the next section.

== Methods ==
=== Histone modification assays ===
The cellular processes of transcription, DNA replication and DNA repair involve the interaction between genomic DNA and nuclear proteins. It had been known that certain regions within chromatin were extremely susceptible to DNAse I digestion, which cleaves DNA in a low sequence specificity manner. Such hypersensitive sites were thought to be transcriptionally active regions, as evidenced by their association with RNA polymerase and topoisomerases I and II.

It is now known that sensitivity to DNAse I regions correspond to regions of chromatin with loose DNA-histone association. Hypersensitive sites most often represent promoters regions, which require for DNA to be accessible for DNA binding transcriptional machinery to function.

==== ChIP-Chip and ChIP-Seq ====
Histone modification was first detected on a genome wide level through the coupling of chromatin immunoprecipitation (ChIP) technology with DNA microarrays, termed ChIP-Chip. However instead of isolating a DNA-binding transcription factor or enhancer protein through chromatin immunoprecipitation, the proteins of interest are the modified histones themselves. First, histones are cross-linked to DNA in vivo through light chemical treatment (e.g., formaldehyde). The cells are next lysed, allowing for the chromatin to be extracted and fragmented, either by sonication or treatment with a non-specific restriction enzyme (e.g., micrococcal nuclease). Modification-specific antibodies in turn, are used to immunoprecipitate the DNA-histone complexes. Following immunoprecipitation, the DNA is purified from the histones, amplified via PCR and labeled with a fluorescent tag (e.g., Cy5, Cy3). The final step involves hybridization of labeled DNA, both immunoprecipitated DNA and non-immunoprecipitated onto a microarray containing immobilized gDNA. Analysis of the relative signal intensity allows the sites of histone modification to be determined.

ChIP-chip was used extensively to characterize the global histone modification patterns of yeast. From these studies, inferences on the function of histone modifications were made; that transcriptional activation or repression was associated with certain histone modifications and by region. While this method was effective providing near full coverage of the yeast epigenome, its use in larger genomes such as humans is limited.

In order to study histone modifications on a truly genome level, other high-throughput methods were coupled with the chromatin immunoprecipitation, namely: SAGE: serial analysis of gene expression (ChIP-SAGE), PET: paired end ditag sequencing (ChIP-PET) and more recently, next-generation sequencing (ChIP-Seq). ChIP-seq follows the same protocol for chromatin immunoprecipitation but instead of amplification of purified DNA and hybridization to a microarray, the DNA fragments are directly sequenced using next generation parallel re-sequencing. It has proven to be an effective method for analyzing the global histone modification patterns and protein target sites, providing higher resolution than previous methods.

=== DNA methylation assays ===
Techniques for characterizing primary DNA sequences could not be directly applied to methylation assays. For example, when DNA was amplified in PCR or bacterial cloning techniques, the methylation pattern was not copied and thus the information lost. The DNA hybridization technique used in DNA assays, in which radioactive probes were used to map and identify DNA sequences, could not be used to distinguish between methylated and non-methylated DNA.

==== Restriction endonuclease based methods ====
===== Non genome-wide approaches =====
The earliest methylation detection assays used methylation modification sensitive restriction endonucleases. Genomic DNA was digested with both methylation-sensitive and insensitive restriction enzymes recognizing the same restriction site. The idea being that whenever the site was methylated, only the methylation insensitive enzyme could cleave at that position. By comparing restriction fragment sizes generated from the methylation-sensitive enzyme to those of the methylation-insensitive enzyme, it was possible to determine the methylation pattern of the region. This analysis step was done by amplifying the restriction fragments via PCR, separating them through gel electrophoresis and analyzing them via southern blot with probes for the region of interest.

This technique was used to compare the DNA methylation modification patterns in the human adult and hemoglobin gene loci. Different regions of the gene (gamma delta beta globin) were known to be expressed at different stages of development. Consistent with a role of DNA methylation in gene repression, regions that were associated with high levels of DNA methylation were not actively expressed.

This method was limited not suitable for studies on the global methylation pattern, or 'methylome'. Even within specific loci it was not fully representative of the true methylation pattern as only those restriction sites with corresponding methylation sensitive and insensitive restriction assays could provide useful information. Further complications could arise when incomplete digestion of DNA by restriction enzymes generated false negative results.

===== Genome wide approaches =====
DNA methylation profiling on a large scale was first made possible through the Restriction Landmark Genome Scanning (RLGS) technique. Like the locus-specific DNA methylation assay, the technique identified methylated DNA via its digestion methylation sensitive enzymes. However it was the use of two-dimensional gel electrophoresis that allowed be characterized on a broader scale.

However it was not until the advent of microarray and next generation sequencing technology when truly high resolution and genome-wide DNA methylation became possible. As with RLGS, the endonuclease component is retained in the method but it is coupled to new technologies. One such approach is the differential methylation hybridization (DMH), in which one set of genomic DNA is digested with methylation-sensitive restriction enzymes and a parallel set of DNA is not digested. Both sets of DNA are subsequently amplified and each labelled with fluorescent dyes and used in two-colour array hybridization. The level of DNA methylation at a given loci is determined by the relative intensity ratios of the two dyes. Adaptation of next generation sequencing to DNA methylation assay provides several advantages over array hybridization. Sequence-based technology provides higher resolution to allele specific DNA methylation, can be performed on larger genomes, and does not require creation of DNA microarrays which require adjustments based on CpG density to properly function.

==== Bisulfite sequencing ====
Bisulfite sequencing relies on chemical conversion of unmethylated cytosines exclusively, such that they can be identified through standard DNA sequencing techniques. Sodium bisulfate and alkaline treatment does this by converting unmethylated cytosine residues into uracil while leaving methylated cytosine unaltered. Subsequent amplification and sequencing of untreated DNA and sodium bisulphite treated DNA allows for methylated sites to be identified. Bisulfite sequencing, like the traditional restriction based methods, was historically limited to methylation patterns of specific gene loci, until whole genome sequencing technologies became available. However, unlike traditional restriction based methods, bisulfite sequencing provided resolution on a nucleotide level.

Limitations of the bisulfite technique include the incomplete conversion of cytosine to uracil, which is a source of false positives. Further, bisulfite treatment also causes DNA degradation and requires an additional purification step to remove the sodium bisulfite.

Next-generation sequencing is well suited in complementing bisulfite sequencing in genome-wide methylation analysis. While this now allows for methylation pattern to be determined on the highest resolution possible, on the single nucleotide level, challenges still remain in the assembly step because of reduced sequence complexity in bisulphite treated DNA. Increases in read length seek to address this challenge, allowing for whole genome shotgun bisulphite sequencing (WGBS) to be performed. The WGBS approach using an Illumina Genome Analyzer platform and has already been implemented in Arabidopsis thaliana. Reduced representation genomic methods based on bisulfite sequencing exist as well, and they are particularly suitable for species with large genome sizes.

=== Chromatin accessibility assays ===
Chromatin accessibility is the measure of how "accessible" or "open" a region of genome is to transcription or binding of transcription factors. The regions which are inaccessible (i.e. because they're bound by nucleosomes) are not actively transcribed by the cell while open and accessible regions are actively transcribed. Changes in chromatin accessibility are important epigenetic regulatory processes that govern cell- or context-specific expression of genes. Assays such as MNase-seq, DNase-seq, ATAC-seq, or FAIRE-seq are routinely used to understand the accessible chromatin landscape of cells. The main feature of all these methods is that they're able to selectively isolate either the DNA sequences that are bounded to the histones, or those that are not. These sequences are then compared to a reference genome that allows to identify their relative position.

MNase-seq and DNase-seq both follow the same principles, as they employ lytic enzymes that target nucleic acids to cut the DNA strands unbounded by nucleosomes or other proteic factors, while the bounded pieces are sheltered, and can be retrieved and analysed. Since active, unbound regions are destroyed, their detection can only be indirect, by sequencing with a Next Generation Sequencing technique and comparison with a reference. MNase-seq utilises a micrococcal nuclease that produces a single strand cleavage on the opposite strand of the target sequence. DNase-seq employs DNase I, a non-specific double strand-cleaving endonuclease. This technique has been used to such an extent that nucleosome-free regions have been labelled as DHSs, DNase I hypersensitive sites, and has been ENCODE consortium's election method for genome wide chromatin accessibility analyses. The main issue of this technique is that the cleavage distribution can be biased, lowering the quality of the results.

FAIRE-seq (Formaldehyde-Assisted Isolation of Regulatory Elements) requires as its first step crosslinking of the DNA with nucleosomes, then DNA shearing by sonication. The free and linked fragments are separated with a traditional phenol-chloroform extraction, since the proteic fraction is stuck in the interphase while the unlinked DNA shifts to the aqueous phase and can be analysed with various methods. Sonication produces random breaks, and therefore is not subject to any kind of bias, and is also the bigger length of the fragments (200-700 nt) makes this technique suitable for wider regions, while it's unable to resolve the single nucleosome. Unlike the nuclease-based methods, FAIRE-seq allows the direct identification of the transcriptionally active sites, and a less laborious sample preparation.

ATAC-seq is based on the activity of Tn5 transposase. The transposase is used to insert tags in the genome, with higher frequency on regions not covered by proteic factors. The tags are then used as adapters for PRC or other analytical tools.

Spatial epigenomic methods extend chromatin accessibility and histone-modification assays to intact tissue sections by combining in situ transposition or antibody-based profiling with spatial barcoding strategies. One such approach, deterministic barcoding in tissue (DBiT-seq), uses orthogonal microfluidic channels to deliver positional barcodes and enables high-spatial-resolution mapping of chromatin state and gene expression in fixed tissues. Commercial implementations of DBiT-seq, such as the AtlasXomics platform, provide microfluidic chips and reagent kits for spatial ATAC-seq and CUT&Tag on fresh-frozen and formalin-fixed paraffin-embedded tissues, and have been used to map chromatin accessibility and histone marks in human dorsal root ganglion and other mammalian tissues.

=== Direct detection ===
Polymerase sensitivity in single-molecule real-time sequencing made it possible for scientists to directly detect epigenetic marks such as methylation as the polymerase moves along the DNA molecule being sequenced. Several projects have demonstrated the ability to collect genome-wide epigenetic data in bacteria.

Nanopore sequencing is based on changes of electrolytic current signals according to base modifications (e.g. Methylation). A polymerase mediates the entrance of ssDNA in the pore: the ion-current variation is modulated by a section of the pore and the consequently generated difference is recorded revealing the position of CpG. Discrimination between hydroxymethylation and methylation is possible thanks to solid-state nanopores even if the current while passing through the high-field region of the pore may be slightly influenced in it. As a reference amplified DNA is used which will not present copied methylationed sites after the PCR process. The Oxford Nanopore Technologies MinION sequencer is a technology where, according to a hidden Markov model, it is possible to distinguish unmethylated cytosine from the methylated one even without chemical treatment that acts to enhance the signal of that modification. The data are registered commonly in picoamperes during established time. Other devices are the Nanopolish and the SignaAlign: the former expresses the frequency of a methylation in a read while the latter gives a probability of it derived from the sum of all the reads.

Single-molecule real-time sequencing (SMRT) is a single-molecule DNA sequencing method. Single-molecule real-time sequencing utilizes a zero-mode waveguide (ZMW). A single DNA polymerase enzyme is bound to the bottom of a ZMW with a single molecule of DNA as a template. Each of the four DNA bases is attached to one of four different fluorescent dyes. When a nucleotide is incorporated by the DNA polymerase, the fluorescent tag is cleaved off and the detector detects the fluorescent signal of the nucleotide incorporation. As the sequencing occurs, the polymerase enzyme kinetics shift when it encounters a region of methylation or any other base modification. When the enzyme encounters chemically modified bases, it will slow down or speed up in a uniquely identifiable way. Fluorescence pulses in SMRT sequencing are characterized not only by their emission spectra but also by their duration and by the interval between successive pulses. These metrics, defined as pulse width and interpulse duration (IPD), add valuable information about DNA polymerase kinetics. Pulse width is a function of all kinetic steps after nucleotide binding and up to fluorophore release, and IPD is determined by the kinetics of nucleotide binding and polymerase translocation.

In 2010 a team of scientists demonstrated the use of single-molecule real-time sequencing for direct detection of modified nucleotide in the DNA template including N6-methyladenosine, 5-methylcytosine and 5-hydroxylcytosine. These various modifications affect polymerase kinetics differently, allowing discrimination between them.

In 2017, another team proposed a combined bisulfite conversion with third-generation single-molecule real-time sequencing, it is called single-molecule real-time bisulfite sequencing (SMRT-BS), which is an accurate targeted CpG methylation analysis method capable of a high degree of multiplying and long read lengths (1.5 kb) without the need for PCR amplicon sub-cloning.

== Theoretical modeling approaches ==
First mathematical models for different nucleosome states affecting gene expression were introduced in 1980s [ref]. Later, this idea was almost forgotten, until the experimental evidence has indicated a possible role of covalent histone modifications as an epigenetic code. In the next several years, high-throughput data have indeed uncovered the abundance of epigenetic modifications and their relation to chromatin functioning which has motivated new theoretical models for the appearance, maintaining and changing these patterns,. These models are usually formulated in the frame of one-dimensional lattice approaches.

== See also ==
- Epigenetics
- Epigenetic clock
- Genomics
- Human Epigenome Project
- Epigenomics AG
- Single cell epigenomics
