= Howard Y. Chang =

American physician-scientist (born 1972)

- 張元豪
- Born: Chang Yuan-hao; January 11, 1972 (age 54); Taipei, Taiwan
- Education: Harvard University (BA, MD); Massachusetts Institute of Technology (PhD)
- Known for: Long non-coding RNA
- Father: Chang Chau-hsiung
- Scientific career
- Fields: Molecular biology
- Workplaces: Stanford University, Amgen
- Thesis: Molecular studies of Fas signaling and programmed cell death (1998)
- Doctoral advisor: David Baltimore
- Other academic advisors: Christopher T. Walsh; Patrick O. Brown

Chinese name
- Traditional Chinese: 張元豪
- Simplified Chinese: 张元豪
Transcriptions
Standard Mandarin
- Hanyu Pinyin: Zhang Yuan-Hao
- Bopomofo: ㄓㄤ ㄩㄢˊ ㄏㄠˊ
- Wade–Giles: Chang Yuan-Hao

Howard Yuan-hao Chang (Chinese: 張元豪; pinyin: Zhāng Yuánháo; born January 11, 1972) is a Taiwanese-American physician-scientist and molecular biologist. He is the Virginia and D. K. Ludwig Professor of Cancer Research at Stanford University, where he is also a joint professor of dermatology, genetics, and pathology at the Stanford University School of Medicine.

Since 2024, Chang has been the senior vice president of research and chief scientific officer of Amgen. From 2018 to 2024, he was a Howard Hughes Medical Institute investigator. He is best known for his research on long non-coding RNAs.

== Early life and education ==
Chang was born in Taipei, Taiwan, on January 11, 1972, to a family of Taiwanese physicians. He is the son of Taiwanese physician and politician Chang Chau-hsiung, a former chair of the People First Party. When he was twelve years old, Chang moved with his mother and younger brother to Southern California.

Chang graduated summa cum laude from Harvard University with a Bachelor of Arts in biochemistry in 1994. As an undergraduate at Harvard College, he worked in the laboratory of biochemist Christopher T. Walsh. He then earned his Ph.D. in biology from the Massachusetts Institute of Technology (MIT) under Nobel laureate David Baltimore in 1998.

In 2000, Chang earned his Doctor of Medicine (M.D.) from Harvard Medical School. As a medical student at Harvard, Chang was a member of the Harvard–MIT Program in Health Sciences and Technology, and won the medical school's Leon Reznick Memorial Prize for excellence in research.

== Academic career ==
After receiving his M.D., Chang was a postdoctoral fellow at Stanford under Patrick O. Brown from 2000 to 2004. He simultaneously completed his residency in dermatology at the Stanford University School of Medicine from 2001 to 2004.

After starting his own lab, Chang's group discovered unexpected transcriptional activity for noncoding DNA and identified HOTAIR which further confirmed the importance of long non-coding RNAs. More recently, his group has reported multiple discoveries related to mechanisms and functional roles of extrachromosomal DNA in cancer pathogenesis.

Chang is a co-inventor of ATAC-seq, a widely-used epigenomic method introduced in 2013 in collaboration with the lab of William J. Greenleaf.

== Awards ==
- 2015 - Paul Marks Prize for Cancer Research
- 2017 - Elected to the National Academy of Medicine
- 2018 - NAS Award in Molecular Biology for "discoveries of long noncoding RNAs and technologies unveiling the noncoding genome."
- 2018 - Investigator, Howard Hughes Medical Institute
- 2020 - Elected to the American Academy of Arts and Sciences
- 2020 - Elected to the National Academy of Sciences
- 2024 - Lurie Prize in Biomedical Sciences
- 2024 - King Faisal Prize in Biology,
- 2024 - Stanley J. Korsmeyer Award
- 2024 - Albany Medical Center Prize jointly with Adrian R. Krainer and Lynne E. Maquat.
