= DNase footprinting assay =

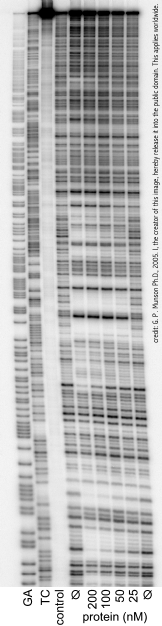
DNase I footprint of a protein binding to a radiolabelled DNA fragment. Lanes "GA" and "TC" are Maxam-Gilbert chemical sequencing lanes, see DNA Sequencing. The lane labelled "control" is for quality control purposes and contains the DNA fragment but not treated with DNase I.

A DNase footprinting assay is a DNA footprinting technique used in molecular biology/biochemistry that detects DNA-protein interaction by leveraging the fact that a protein bound to DNA often protects it from enzymatic cleavage. This makes it possible to locate a protein binding site on a particular DNA molecule. The method uses an enzyme, deoxyribonuclease (DNase, for short), to cut the end-labeled DNA radioactively, followed by gel electrophoresis to detect the resulting cleavage pattern.

For example, the DNA fragment of interest may be amplified by PCR using a ^{32}P 5' labeled primer, with the result being many DNA molecules with a radioactive label on one end of one strand of each double-stranded molecule. Cleavage by DNase will produce fragments. The smaller fragments, relative to the ^{32}P-labelled end, will appear further on the gel than the longer fragments. The gel is then placed against a special photographic film to detect the radioactive signal.

The cleavage pattern of the DNA in the absence of a DNA-binding protein (typically referred to as free DNA) is compared to that in the presence of a DNA-binding protein. If the protein binds to DNA, the binding site is protected from enzymatic cleavage. This protection will result in a clear area on the gel that is referred to as the "footprint".

By varying the concentration of the DNA-binding protein, the binding affinity of the protein can be estimated according to the minimum concentration of protein at which a footprint is observed.

This technique was developed in 1977 by David J. Galas and Albert Schmitz at the University of Geneva.

== See also ==
- DNA footprinting
- DNase II
- Toeprinting assay
