= Mayo High School =

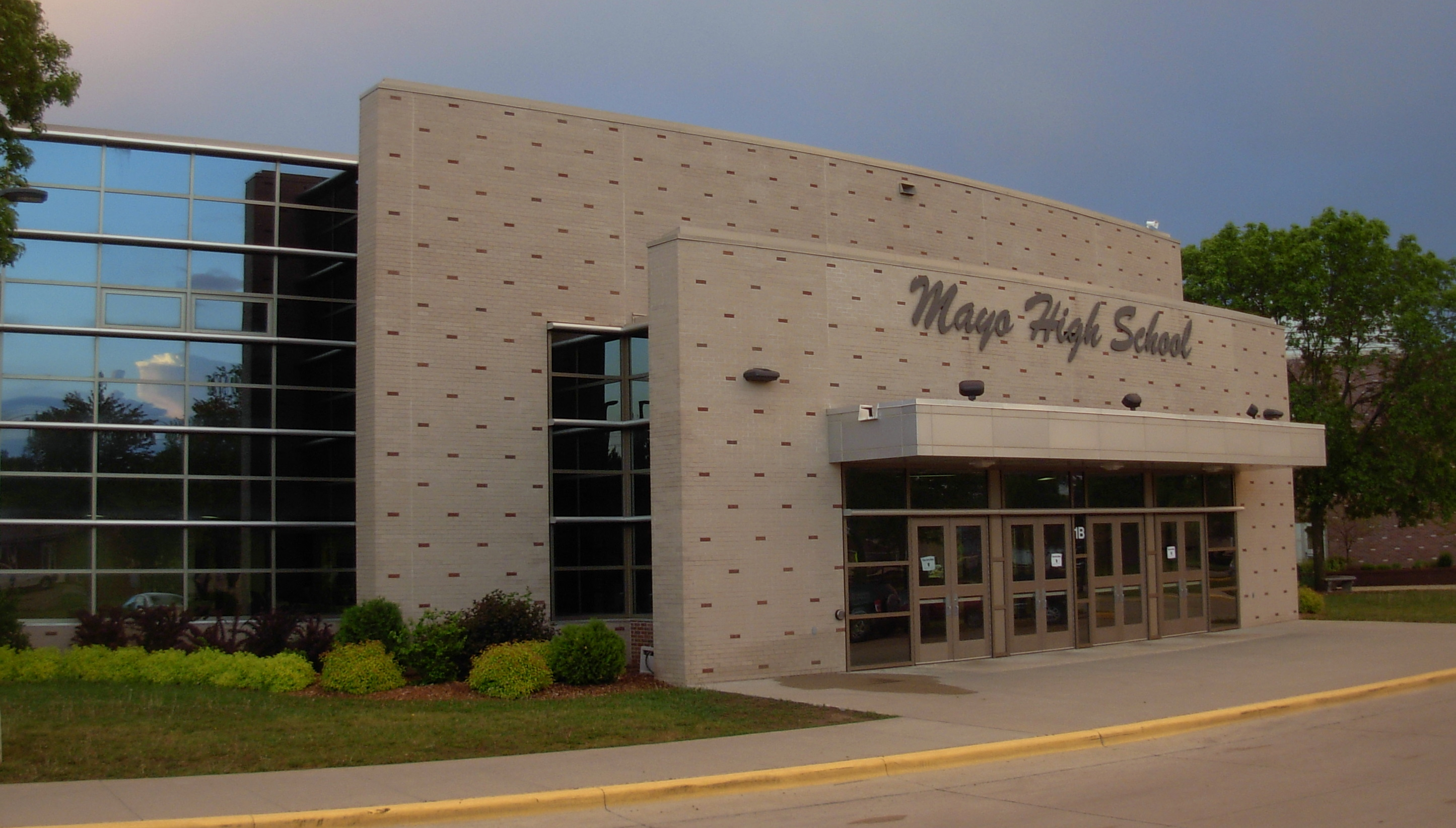
- Mayo High School main entrance

Location
- 1420 11th Avenue Southeast; Rochester, Minnesota 55904; United States; 44°0′10″N 92°26′51″W

Information
- Type: Coed Public High School
- Motto: "To be a Spartan is to be the very best that one can be"
- Established: 1966
- CEEB code: 242103
- Principal: Troy Prigge
- Teaching staff: 79.99 (FTE)
- Grades: 9–12
- Enrollment: 1,820 (2023–2024)
- Student to teacher ratio: 22.75
- Colors: Green and gold
- Mascot: Sparty the Mayo Spartan
- Nickname: Spartans
- Newspaper: Advocate
- Yearbook: Odyssey
- Website: mayo.rochester.k12.mn.us

Mayo High School (Mayo) is a public high school in Rochester, Minnesota, United States. It is named after the brothers William James Mayo and Charles Horace Mayo, physicians and founders of the Mayo Clinic. It is a public school and part of the Rochester Independent School District #535. It is notable for being constructed in an almost perfect circle aside from a few appendages, and for housing the Rochester Planetarium. The current principal of Mayo High School is Troy Prigge.

== History ==
Mayo High School was built in 1966 in the southeastern section of Rochester, Minnesota. It has a capacity to hold approximately 1800 students (although historically the student populations of both Mayo and John Marshall high schools have exceeded well over 2,000 students) and was the largest high school in the city until Century High School was built, and was named after the brothers William James Mayo and Charles Horace Mayo, physicians and founders of Mayo Clinic.

== Statistics ==
As of 2020, there are 1689 students attending Mayo High School. There are 92 teachers and a student to teacher ratio of 18:1. The boy to girl student ratio is 51:49.

== Curricular and extra curricular ==
The school mascot is a Spartan warrior. The sports teams, students, and staff are known as the Mayo Spartans. The school colors are green and gold. It has teams in speech, chess, classic debate, theatre, mock trial, football, tennis, swimming, cross country, soccer, lacrosse, softball, baseball, rowing, basketball, golf, hockey, volleyball, track and field, Science Olympiad, FIRST Robotics Competition team, Math League, and Knowledge Bowl. Students may also letter in citywide athletics such as crew with the Rochester Rowing Club, figure-skating with the Rochester Figure Skating Club, Nordic skiing with the Rochester Nordic Ski Team, and mountain biking with the Rochester Mountain Bike Team.

== Sports ==
Mayo High School participates in many sports, competing in the Big 9 conference within the Minnesota State High School League, usually at the largest class level. The sports available are boys baseball, boys and girls basketball, boys and girls cross country, boys and girls hockey, girls cheerleading, boys football, boys and girls soccer, boys and girls golf, girls softball, boys and girls swimming, girls dance team, boys and girls track and field, boys and girls tennis, boys wrestling, and girls volleyball, and bowling.

The boys' tennis team won a state championship in 2007 and 2011.

The girl's tennis team won a state championship in 2023, 2024, 2025, and 2026.

Mayo High School acquired the removable NFL football turf from the Minnesota Vikings after the demolition of the Metrodome in 2014.

== Notable alumni ==
- Barbara Cegavske - Secretary of State of Nevada (2015–2023)
- Yung Gravy - rapper
- William Greenleaf - professor of genetics at Stanford University
- Jim Johannson - ice hockey player, coach and USA Hockey executive
- John Johannson - professional ice hockey player
- Mark Mattson - neuroscientist at the National Institutes of Health and professor at the Johns Hopkins University School of Medicine
- Coco and Kelly Miller - WNBA players
- Gordon Moore (judge) - Associate Justice of the Minnesota Supreme Court
- Michael Restovich - MLB player
- Aaron Senne - minor League baseball player
- Eric Strobel - member of Miracle on Ice, gold medalist at the 1980 Winter Olympics in hockey
