= Single cell epigenomics =

Study of epigenomics in individual cells by single cell sequencing

An overview of methods for single-cell epigenomic sequencing. Each method is labelled on the bottom row. Arrows are coloured by method, showing the flow from starting material to sequence data. Adapted from

Single cell epigenomics is the study of epigenomics (the complete set of epigenetic modifications on the genetic material of a cell) in individual cells by single cell sequencing. Since 2013, methods have been created including whole-genome single-cell bisulfite sequencing to measure DNA methylation, whole-genome ChIP-sequencing to measure histone modifications, whole-genome ATAC-seq to measure chromatin accessibility and chromosome conformation capture.

== Single-cell DNA methylome sequencing ==
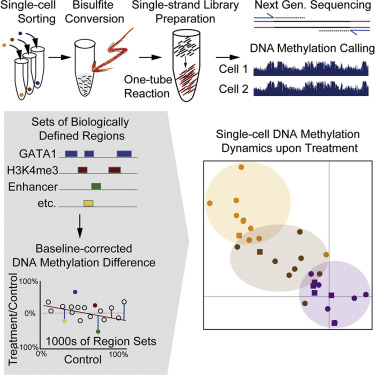
One method for single cell DNA methylation sequencing

Single cell DNA genome sequencing quantifies DNA methylation. This is similar to single cell genome sequencing, but with the addition of a bisulfite treatment before sequencing. Forms include whole genome bisulfite sequencing, and reduced representation bisulfite sequencing

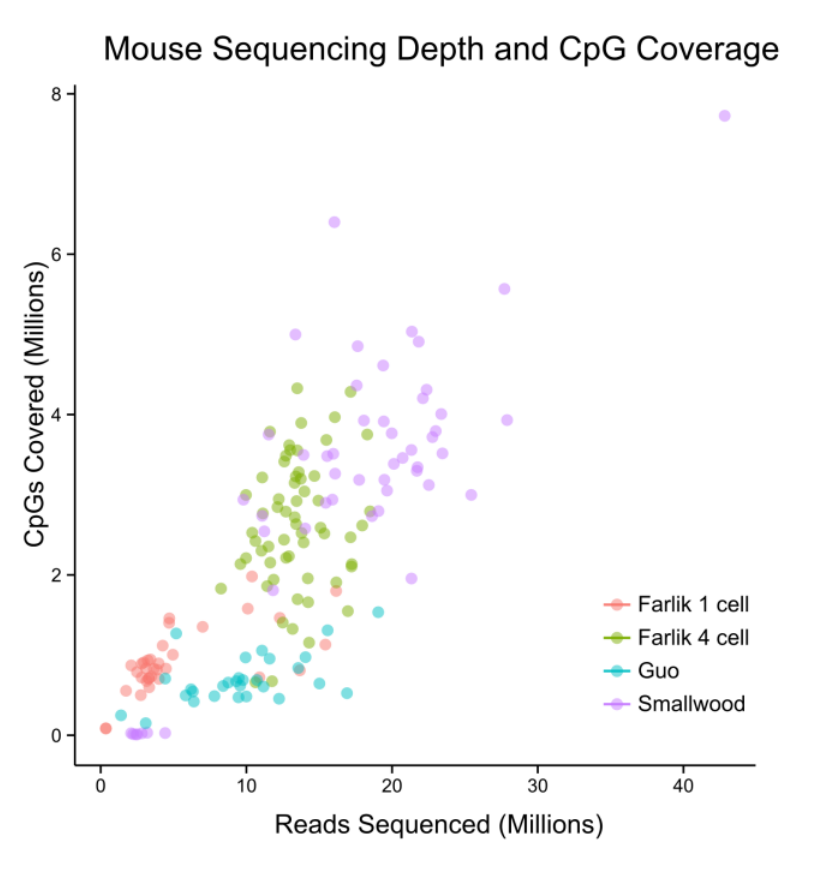
Comparison of single cell DNA methylation sequencing methods in terms of coverage as at 2015 on Mus musculus

== Single-cell ATAC-seq ==
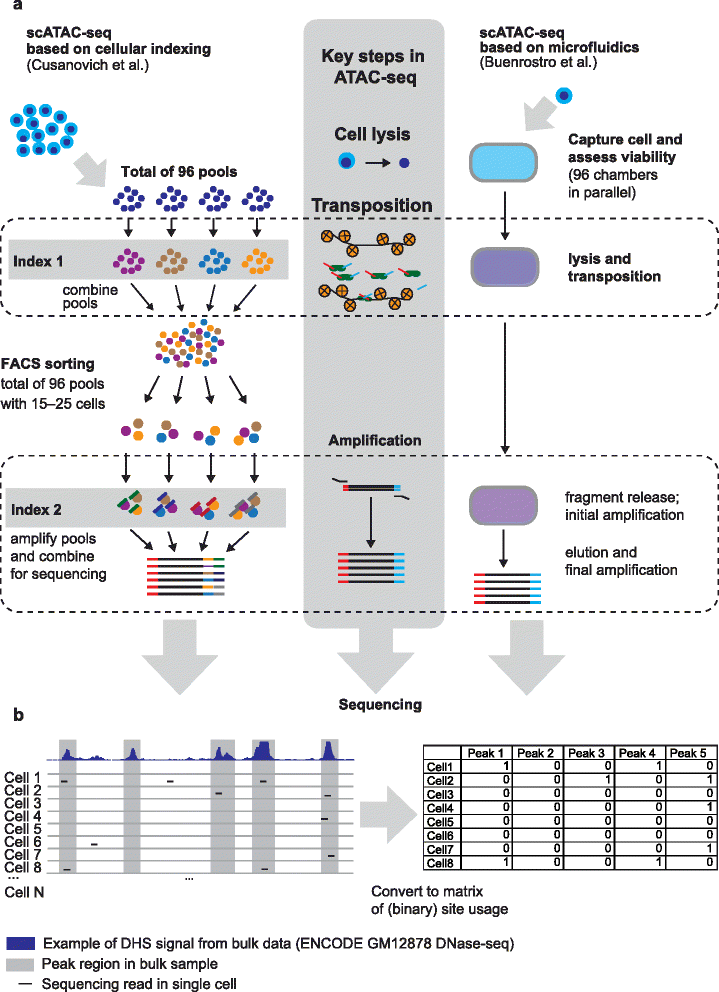
Two methods for single-cell ATAC-seq

ATAC-seq stands for Assay for Transposase-Accessible Chromatin with high throughput sequencing. It is a technique used in molecular biology to identify accessible DNA regions, equivalent to DNase I hypersensitive sites. Single cell ATAC-seq has been performed since 2015, using methods ranging from FACS sorting, microfluidic isolation of single cells, to combinatorial indexing. In initial studies, the method was able to reliably separate cells based on their cell types, uncover sources of cell-to-cell variability, and show a link between chromatin organization and cell-to-cell variation.

== Single-cell ChIP-seq ==
ChIP-sequencing, also known as ChIP-seq, is a method used to analyze protein interactions with DNA. ChIP-seq combines chromatin immunoprecipitation (ChIP) with massively parallel DNA sequencing to identify the binding sites of DNA-associated proteins. In epigenomics, this is often used to assess histone modifications (such as methylation). ChIP-seq is also often used to determine transcription factor binding sites.

Single-cell ChIP-seq is extremely challenging due to background noise caused by nonspecific antibody pull-down, and only one study so far has performed it successfully. This study used a droplet-based microfluidics approach, and the low coverage required thousands of cells to be sequenced in order to assess cellular heterogeneity.

== Single-cell Hi-C ==
Chromosome conformation capture techniques (often abbreviated to 3C technologies or 3C-based methods) are a set of molecular biology methods used to analyze the spatial organization of chromatin in a cell. These methods quantify the number of interactions between genomic loci that are nearby in three dimensional space, even if the loci are separated by many kilobases in the linear genome.

Currently, 3C methods start with a similar set of steps, performed on a sample of cells. First, the cells are cross-linked, which introduces bonds between proteins, and between proteins and nucleic acids, that effectively "freeze" interactions between genomic loci. The genome is then cut digested into fragments through the use of restriction enzymes. Next, proximity based ligation is performed, creating long regions of hybrid DNA. Lastly, the hybrid DNA is sequenced to determine genomic loci that are in close proximity to each other.

Single-cell Hi-C is a modification of the original Hi-C protocol, which is an adaptation of the 3C method, that allows you to determine proximity of different regions of the genome in a single cell. This method was made possible by performing the digestion and ligation steps in individual nuclei, as opposed to the original Hi-C protocol, where ligation was performed after cell lysis in a pool containing crosslinked chromatin complexes. In single cell Hi-C, after ligation, single cells are isolated and the remaining steps are performed in separate compartments, and hybrid DNA is tagged with a compartment specific barcode. High-throughput sequencing is then performed on the pool of the hybrid DNA from the single cells. Although the recovery rate of sequenced interactions (hybrid DNA) can be as low as 2.5% of potential interactions, it has been possible to generate three dimensional maps of entire genomes using this method. Additionally, advances have been made in the analysis of Hi-C data, allowing for the enhancement of HiC datasets to generate even more accurate and detailed contact maps and 3D models.

== See also ==
- Single cell sequencing
- Epigenomics
- Chromosome conformation capture
