= Electrophoretic mobility shift assay =

Technique used to study DNA and RNA

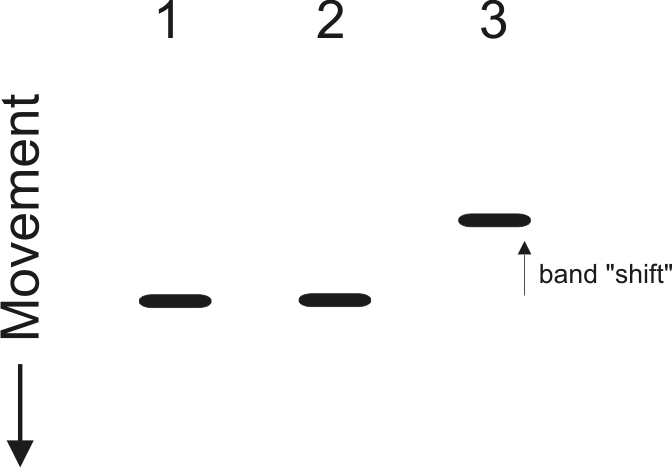
Lane 1 is a negative control, and contains only genetic material. Lane 2 contains protein as well as a DNA fragment that, based on its sequence, does not interact. Lane 3 contains protein and a DNA fragment that does react; the resulting complex is larger, heavier, and slower-moving. The pattern shown in lane 3 is the one that would result if all the DNA were bound and no dissociation of complex occurred during electrophoresis. When these conditions are not met a second band might be seen in lane 3 reflecting the presence of free DNA or the dissociation of the DNA-protein complex.

Schematic of an EMSA showing the labeled DNA (dark band) move up the gel as more protein is added, as indicted by the triangle below

An electrophoretic mobility shift assay (EMSA) or mobility shift electrophoresis, also referred as a gel shift assay, gel mobility shift assay, band shift assay, or gel retardation assay, is a common affinity electrophoresis technique used to study protein–DNA or protein–RNA interactions. This procedure can determine if a protein or mixture of proteins is capable of binding to a given DNA or RNA sequence, and can sometimes indicate if more than one protein molecule is involved in the binding complex. Gel shift assays are often performed in vitro concurrently with DNase footprinting, primer extension, and promoter-probe experiments when studying transcription initiation, DNA gang replication, DNA repair or RNA processing and maturation, as well as pre-mRNA splicing. Although precursors can be found in earlier literature, most current assays are based on methods described by Garner and Revzin and Fried and Crothers.

== Principle ==
A mobility shift assay is electrophoretic separation of a protein–DNA or protein–RNA mixture on a polyacrylamide or agarose gel for a short period (about 1.5-2 hr for a 15- to 20-cm gel). The speed at which different molecules (and combinations thereof) move through the gel is determined by their size and charge, and to a lesser extent, their shape (see gel electrophoresis). The control lane (DNA probe without protein present) will contain a single band corresponding to the unbound DNA or RNA fragment. However, assuming that the protein is capable of binding to the fragment, the lane with a protein that binds present will contain another band that represents the larger, less mobile complex of nucleic acid probe bound to protein which is 'shifted' up on the gel (since it has moved more slowly).

Under the correct experimental conditions, the interaction between the DNA (or RNA) and protein is stabilized and the ratio of bound to unbound nucleic acid on the gel reflects the fraction of free and bound probe molecules as the binding reaction enters the gel. This stability is in part due to a "caging effect", in that the protein, surrounded by the gel matrix, is unable to diffuse away from the probe before they recombine. If the starting concentrations of protein and probe are known, and if the stoichiometry of the complex is known, the apparent affinity of the protein for the nucleic acid sequence may be determined. Unless the complex is very long lived under gel conditions, or dissociation during electrophoresis is taken into account, the number derived is an apparent Kd. If the protein concentration is not known but the complex stoichiometry is, the protein concentration can be determined by increasing the concentration of DNA probe until further increments do not increase the fraction of protein bound. By comparison with a set of standard dilutions of free probe run on the same gel, the number of moles of protein can be calculated.

== Variants and additions ==
An antibody that recognizes the protein can be added to this mixture to create an even larger complex with a greater shift. This method is referred to as a supershift assay, and is used to unambiguously identify a protein present in the protein – nucleic acid complex.

Often, an extra lane is run with a competitor oligonucleotide to determine the most favorable binding sequence for the binding protein. The use of different oligonucleotides of defined sequence allows the identification of the precise binding site by competition (not shown in diagram). Variants of the competition assay are useful for measuring the specificity of binding and for measurement of association and dissociation kinetics. Thus, EMSA might also be used as part of a SELEX experiment to select for oligonucleotides that do actually bind a given protein.

Once DNA-protein binding is determined in vitro, a number of algorithms can narrow the search for identification of the transcription factor. Consensus sequence oligonucleotides for the transcription factor of interest will be able to compete for the binding, eliminating the shifted band, and must be confirmed by supershift. If the predicted consensus sequence fails to compete for binding, identification of the transcription factor may be aided by Multiplexed Competitor EMSA (MC-EMSA), whereby large sets of consensus sequences are multiplexed in each reaction, and where one set competes for binding, the individual consensus sequences from this set are run in a further reaction.

For visualization purposes, the nucleic acid fragment is usually labelled with a radioactive, fluorescent or biotin label. Standard ethidium bromide staining is less sensitive than these methods and can lack the sensitivity to detect the nucleic acid if small amounts of nucleic acid or single-stranded nucleic acid(s) are used in these experiments. When using a biotin label, streptavidin conjugated to an enzyme such as horseradish peroxidase is used to detect the DNA fragment. While isotopic DNA labeling has little or no effect on protein binding affinity, use of non-isotopic labels including fluorophores or biotin can alter the affinity and/or stoichiometry of the protein interaction of interest. Competition between fluorophore- or biotin-labeled probe and unlabeled DNA of the same sequence can be used to determine whether the label alters binding affinity or stoichiometry.
