= Ionian Technologies =

Defunct healthcare company

Ionian Technologies Inc.
- Company type: Private
- Industry: biotechnology company- Minor
- Founded: 2000 Spinoff from Keck Graduate Institute; 2001 incorporated
- Headquarters: San Diego, California
- Key people: Andrew P. Miller, President & CEO
- Products: None
- Revenue: ▲Not Disclosed USD (2006)
- Operating income: ▲ Not Disclosed USD (2005)
- Net income: ▲ Not Disclosed USD (2005)
- Number of employees: 13 (2009)
- Website: www.ionian-tech.com

Ionian Technologies Inc. was a United States Biotechnology Company focused on molecular diagnostics development for the detection of infectious diseases and biothreat agents. It was established in 2000 in Upland, California as the first spin-off company to commercialize technology developed at the Keck Graduate Institute. Since its inception Ionian has expanded its isothermal amplification technology. Ionian was acquired in July 2010 by Alere Inc, which was later acquired by Abbott Labs in 2017.

== History ==
Ionian traces its origins to Dr. David J. Galas who was previously co-founder, Chancellor, Chief Scientific Officer and Norris Professor of Applied Life Science at the Keck Graduate Institute (KGI) of Applied Life Sciences. During his development of KGI he spun off Ionian Technologies from work done in his lab, based upon a 2003 PNAS paper.

In 2001, Ionian was incorporated in Delaware.

== Technology ==
Ionian's proprietary isothermal technology, termed the Nicking Enzyme Amplification Reaction Assay, is claimed to be capable of amplifying extremely low amounts of starting material to easily detectable levels in just a few minutes. The proprietary technology is based on the very rapid detection of small DNA or RNA fragments generated directly from the target nucleic acid. The amplification products can be detected by a variety of standard methods, including LC-MS, real-time fluorescence, lateral flow and capillary electrophoresis detection. Ionian's assay technology is therefore ideally suited for portable and handheld detectors and sensors.

== Mission ==
Ionian Technologies Inc. focused on molecular diagnostics and advanced biomedical research tools based on proprietary isothermal systems for DNA and RNA amplification and detection. This technology focused on the development of products for the medical diagnostics, agricultural (GMO), veterinary, food hygiene and biodefense markets. Ionian made efforts for providing rapid and economical systems for third world countries and have received funding from the Bill and Melinda Gates Foundation to achieve these goals.

== See also ==
- Keck Graduate Institute
