= David J. Galas =

David John Galas (February 25, 1944 – May 27, 2023) was a molecular biologist, notable for his scientific discoveries, founder role in biotechnology firms, and leadership role at the U.S. Department of Energy in the Human Genome Project.

== Early life and education ==
The son of an American military officer stationed in London, UK, Galas grew up in Englefield Green, a village west of London, attending local English schools. His early interest in the natural world and science developed while exploring the English countryside. Returning to the United States for college, he attended the University of California, Berkeley, receiving a Bachelor of Arts (AB) in physics in 1967. On recommendation of physicist Edward Teller, he was awarded a Hertz Foundation fellowship for graduate study at the University of California, Davis, where he received a PhD in theoretical physics in 1972 and subsequently became a staff member at Lawrence Livermore National Laboratory (LLNL).

== Early Academic Career ==
While at LLNL, Galas transitioned from physics to molecular biology, collaborating with Elbert Branscomb on protein synthesis research. From 1977 to 1981 he was a postdoctoral researcher at the University of Geneva in the lab of Jeffrey H. Miller. With Albert Schmitz he discovered the DNase footprinting assay method. Galas returned to the United States in 1981 to join the faculty at the University of Southern California (USC), rising to the rank of professor and eventually chair of the Molecular Biology Section, holding the Ester Dornsife Chair in Biological Sciences.

== Human Genome Project ==
In 1990, Galas took a leave of absence to serve as director of the Office of Biological and Environmental Research at the U.S. Department of Energy. Working with Francis Collins, who was then director of the National Center for Human Genome Research at the NIH, Galas coordinated the national effort in the Human Genome Project, managing the DOE's participation in the initiative. Galas took a particular interest in sponsoring a new emphasis on ethical, legal, and social issues (ELSI).

== Darwin Molecular ==
Instead of returning to USC, Galas in 1993 co-founded Darwin Molecular Corporation, a biotechnology company based in Bothell, Washington, serving as the company’s president and chief scientific officer. The company’s goal was to integrate genomics, bioinformatics, and combinatorial chemistry to accelerate drug discovery. Early investors included Bill Gates and Paul Allen.

The company soon discovered the SOST gene (which encodes the protein sclerostin), leading to the development of romosozumab (brand name Evenity), an FDA-approved treatment for osteoporosis marketed by Amgen. Darwin Molecular was acquired by the British biotechnology firm Chiroscience in 1996 for approximately $120 million.

== Later Academic Career ==
In 1999, Galas was a co-founder of the Keck Graduate Institute (KGI), the seventh member of the Claremont Colleges. At KGI, he served as chief academic and scientific officer and dean of the faculty, serving until 2005. During this time, his lab spun off Ionian Technologies as a startup company.

From 2005 to 2008, Galas was vice president and chief science officer for life sciences at the Battelle Memorial Institute, later serving, until 2012, as senior vice president and professor at the Institute for Systems Biology (ISB) in Seattle. In 2012, he joined the Pacific Northwest Research Institute (PNRI) in Seattle as a principal scientist and professor. At PNRI, the Galas lab, focused on developing new computational and mathematical methods for analyzing complex biological data.

== Leadership activities ==
Galas served on the board of directors of the Washington Research Foundation (WRF) from 2013 to 2023 and was the founding chair of the WRF's scientific advisory committee (SAC). He was a member of the board of directors for the Fannie and John Hertz Foundation for over 30 years and served as the chairman of the board of the Hertz Foundation from 2008 to 2022.

== Death ==
Galas died of brain cancer on May 27, 2023, in his home on Bainbridge Island, Washington.
