= MeRIPseq =

MeRIPseq (or MeRIP-seq) stands for methylated RNA immunoprecipitation sequencing, which is a method for detection of post-transcriptional RNA modifications, developed by Kate Meyer et al. while working in the laboratory of Sammie Jaffrey at Cornell University Graduate School of Medical Sciences. It is also called m6A-seq.

A variation of the MerIP-seq method was coined by Benjamin Delatte and colleagues in 2016. This variant, called hMerIP-seq (hydroxymethylcytosine RNA immunoprecipitation), uses an antibody that specifically recognizes 5-hydroxymethylcytosine, a modified RNA base affecting in vitro translation and brain development in Drosophila.
