= SHOX2 =

Protein-coding gene in the species Homo sapiens

Identifiers
- Aliases: SHOX2, OG12, OG12X, SHOT, short stature homeobox 2
- External IDs: OMIM: 602504; MGI: 1201673; GeneCards: SHOX2

Gene location (Human)
Chr.	Chromosome 3 (human)
Band	3q25.32	Start	158,095,905 bp
Band	3q25.32	End	158,106,420 bp

Gene location (Mouse)
Chr.	Chromosome 3 (mouse)
Band	3 E1|3 30.76 cM	Start	66,879,060 bp
Band	3 E1|3 30.76 cM	End	66,889,104 bp
RNA expression pattern
Bgee	Human / Mouse (ortholog); Top expressed in: buccal mucosa cell; lateral nuclear group of thalamus; saphenous vein; tendon of biceps brachii; sperm; popliteal artery; tibial arteries; Achilles tendon; spinal ganglia; tibial nerve / Top expressed in: medial dorsal nucleus; lateral geniculate nucleus; medial geniculate nucleus; inferior colliculi; lumbar spinal ganglion; electrical conduction system of the heart; body of femur; superior colliculus; dermis; facial motor nucleus; More reference expression data
BioGPS	n/a
Gene ontology
Molecular function	sequence-specific DNA binding; DNA binding; DNA-binding transcription factor activity, RNA polymerase II-specific
Cellular component	nucleus
Biological process	cartilage development involved in endochondral bone morphogenesis; skeletal system development; regulation of chondrocyte differentiation; heart valve development; regulation of transcription, DNA-templated; chondrocyte differentiation; positive regulation of smoothened signaling pathway; chondrocyte development; negative regulation of transcription by RNA polymerase II; positive regulation of skeletal muscle fiber development; positive regulation of axonogenesis; nervous system development; multicellular organism development; development of the heart; positive regulation of mesenchymal cell proliferation; embryonic limb morphogenesis; muscle tissue morphogenesis; regulation of branching morphogenesis of a nerve; embryonic morphogenesis; osteoblast differentiation; embryonic digestive tract morphogenesis; embryonic skeletal joint morphogenesis; cardiac atrium morphogenesis; embryonic forelimb morphogenesis; positive regulation of transcription by RNA polymerase II; regulation of transcription by RNA polymerase II
Sources:Amigo / QuickGO
Orthologs
Databases	NCBI: entry; OMA: entry
Species	Human	Mouse
Entrez	6474	20429
Ensembl	ENSG00000168779	ENSMUSG00000027833
UniProt	O60902	P70390
RefSeq (mRNA)	NM_001163678; NM_003030; NM_006884	NM_013665; NM_001302357; NM_001302358; NM_001302359
RefSeq (protein)	NP_001157150; NP_003021; NP_006875	NP_001289286; NP_001289287; NP_001289288; NP_038693
Location (UCSC)	Chr 3: 158.1 – 158.11 Mb	Chr 3: 66.88 – 66.89 Mb
PubMed search
- Wikidata
View/Edit Human	View/Edit Mouse

Short-stature homeobox 2, also known as homeobox protein Og12X or paired-related homeobox protein SHOT, is a protein that in humans is encoded by the SHOX2 gene.

== Function ==
SHOX2 is a member of the homeobox family of genes that encode proteins containing a 60-amino acid residue motif that represents a DNA-binding domain. Homeobox proteins have been characterized extensively as transcriptional regulators involved in pattern formation in both invertebrate and vertebrate species.

== Clinical significance ==
Several human genetic disorders are caused by aberrations in human homeobox genes.

This gene is a paralog of SHOX, a pseudoautosomal homeobox gene that is thought to be responsible for idiopathic short stature. SHOX is also implicated in the short stature phenotype associated with Turner syndrome.

This gene is considered to be a candidate gene for Cornelia de Lange syndrome.

SHOX2 localises on chromosome 3, so it is an autosomal and not a pseudoautosomal homeobox (SHOX, which localises on the PAR1 region of chromosome X and Y, has a pseudoautosomal hereditability).
