= Epigenomics AG =

Epigenomics
- Type: Public
- Traded as: FWB: ECX
- ISIN: DE000A11QW50
- Industry: Molecular Diagnostics
- Founded: 1998
- Headquarters: Berlin, Germany; Seattle, Washington
- Products: Epi proColon & Epi proLung (not available in the US).
- Website: www.epigenomics.com

Epigenomics AG is a molecular diagnostics company headquartered in Berlin, Germany with a wholly owned subsidiary, Epigenomics Inc. based in Seattle, WA.

== History ==
Epigenomics was founded in Berlin, Germany in 1998 by serial entrepreneur Dr Alexander Olek. Around the same time, ORCA Biosciences was founded in Seattle, WA. The companies merged in 2000, and have focused on applying DNA methylation based biomarkers to address medical needs. Epigenomics became a publicly traded company with its listing on the Frankfurt Exchange in 2004 raising €41.6 million. The company maintains a work force in Berlin, as well as in Seattle.

== Focus ==
Epigenomics is focused on developing and marketing molecular diagnostics for oncology. The company has discovered DNA methylation based biomarkers for a number of oncology related indications, has developed enabling technologies for the analysis of methylation in blood and other body fluids, and is bringing medically important products to the market.

Key contributions to biomarker science based on DNA methylation include:

SEPT9 - Measurement in blood for detection of colon cancer.

SHOX2 - Measurement in lung fluid to aid in diagnosis of lung cancer.

PITX2 - Measurement in prostate tissue as a prognosis factor for prostate cancer.

The company continues to focus on discovering and validating DNA methylation based biomarkers, and developing the technology to make DNA methylation testing a routine practice in the clinical laboratory. Where possible, the results of these efforts are shared with the scientific community, as evidenced by >60 peer reviewed scientific publications over the past 10 years.

== Products ==
Epigenomics has developed and launched two CE marked IVD products based on methylation biomarkers:

- Epi proColon - a test to measure the methylation status of the SEPT9 promoter in plasma as an aid in early detection of colon cancer.
- Epi proLung - a test to measure the methylation status of the SHOX2 gene in bronchial lavage fluid, to help in the workup of patients suspect to have lung cancer.

These products are not currently available in the U.S.

Epigenomics has licensed the SEPT9 biomarker and certain DNA methylation technologies to Quest Diagnostics and ARUP Laboratories in the US, as well as Warnex Laboratories in Canada. These labs have independently launched Laboratory Developed Tests for the SEPT9 biomarker, and are providing this SEPT9 testing service to the medical community in the US and Canada. Although these tests were developed independently by the licensees and Epigenomics therefore cannot guarantee their performance, the results of clinical validations by these companies are very similar to those obtained by Epigenomics. Epigenomics also has a strategic partnership with Abbott Molecular for the development of an IVD test kit based on the SEPT9 biomarker. Abbott has launched this test as a CE marked IVD in Europe under the brand name mS9.

== Additional Publications ==
- Payne S.R. (2010). "From discovery to the clinic: the novel DNA methylation biomarker mSEPT9 for the detection of colorectal cancer in blood". Epigenomics. 2 (4): 575–585. doi:10.2217/epi.10.35. PMID 22121975.
