= Protein footprinting =

Protein footprinting is a term used to refer to a method of biochemical analysis that investigates protein structure, assembly, and interactions within a larger macromolecular assembly. It was originally coined in reference to the use of limited proteolysis to investigate contact sites within a monoclonal antibody - protein antigen complex and a year later to examine the protection from hydroxyl radical cleavage conferred by a protein bound to DNA within a DNA-protein complex. In DNA footprinting the protein is envisioned to make an imprint (or footprint) at a particular point of interaction. This latter method was adapted through the direct treatment of proteins and their complexes with hydroxyl radicals and can be generally denoted RP-MS (for Radical Probe - Mass Spectrometry) akin to the designation used for Hydrogen-deuterium exchange Mass Spectrometry (denoted HD-MS or HX-MS).

== Hydroxyl radical protein footprinting ==
Time-resolved hydroxyl radical protein footprinting (HRPF) employing mass spectrometry analysis was originated and developed in the late 1990s in synchrotron radiolysis studies. The same year, these authors (Maleknia et al.) reported on the use of an electrical discharge source to effect the oxidation of proteins on millisecond timescales as proteins pass from the electrosprayed solution into the mass spectrometer. Years later in 2005, researchers Hambly and Gross introduced a method for protein oxidation on the microsecond timescale using laser flash photolysis of hydrogen peroxide to generate hydroxyl radicals. This method, fast photochemical oxidation of proteins (FPOP), claimed to footprint proteins faster than they change their fold though this timeframe has been challenged given hydrogen peroxide, not present in the original studies, and secondary radicals, react alone in situ over tens of milliseconds. The combined approaches have since been used to determine protein structures, protein folding, protein dynamics, and protein–protein interactions.

Unlike nucleic acids, proteins oxidize rather than cleave on these timescales. Analysis of the products by mass spectrometry reveals that proteins are oxidized in a limited manner (some 10–30% of total protein) at a number of amino acid side chains across the proteins. The rate or level of oxidation at the reactive amino acid side chains (Met, Cys, Trp, Tyr, Phe, His, Pro and Leu) provides a measure of their accessibility to the bulk solvent. The mechanisms of side chain oxidation were explored by performing the radiolysis reactions in ^{18}O-labeled water.

== Producing OH radicals ==
A critical feature of these experiments is the need to expose proteins to hydroxyl radicals for limited timescales on the order of 1–50 ms inducing 10-30% oxidation of total protein. A further requirement is to generate hydroxyl radicals from the bulk solvent (i.e. water) (equations 1 and 2) not hydrogen peroxide which can remain to oxidize proteins even without other stimuli.

H_{2}O → H_{2}O^{+•} + e^{−} + H_{2}O^{*}
H_{2}O^{+•} + H_{2}O → H_{3}O^{+} + OH^{•}

Hydroxyl radicals can be produced in solution by an electrical discharge within a conventional atmospheric pressure electrospray ionization (ESI) source. When a high voltage difference (~8 keV) is held between an electrospray needle and a sampling orifice to the mass analyzer, radicals can be produced in solution at the electrospray needle tip. This method was the first employed to apply protein footprinting to the study of a protein complex.

== Method ==
The exposure of proteins to a "white" X-ray beam of synchrotron light or an electrical discharge for tens of milliseconds provides sufficient oxidative modification to the surface amino acid side chains without damage to the protein structure. These products can be easily detected and quantified by mass spectrometry. By adjusting the time for radiolysis or which protein ions spend in the discharge source, a time-resolved approach is possible which is valuable for the study of protein dynamics.

== Analysis ==
A computer program (PROXIMO) has also been written to help model protein complexes using data from the RP-MS/Protein footprinting approach. RP-MS/Protein footprinting studies of protein complexes can also employ computational approaches to assist with this modeling.

== Applications ==
The application of ion mobility mass spectrometry has conclusively demonstrated that the conditions employed in RP-MS/Protein footprinting experiments do not alter the structure of proteins.

Other studies have extended the method to study early onset protein damage given the radical basis of the method and the significance of oxygen based radicals in the pathogenesis of many diseases including neurological disorders and even blindness.

== See also ==
- Hydrogen–deuterium exchange
- Peptide mass fingerprinting
- Protein sequencing
- DNA profiling
