= Toeprinting assay =

Method in molecular biology

The toeprinting assay, also known as the primer extension inhibition assay, is a method used in molecular biology that allows one to examine the interactions between messenger RNA and ribosomes or RNA-binding proteins. It is different from the more commonly used DNA footprinting assay. The toeprinting assay has been utilized to examine the formation of the translation initiation complex.

To do a toeprint assay, one needs the mRNA of interest, ribosomes, a DNA primer, free nucleotides, and reverse transcriptase (RT), among other reagents. The assay involves letting the RT generate cDNA until it gets blocked by any bound ribosomes, resulting in shorter fragments called toeprints when the results are observed on a sequencing gel.
