= DNase-Seq =

DNase-seq (DNase I hypersensitive sites sequencing) is a method in molecular biology used to identify the location of regulatory regions, based on the genome-wide sequencing of regions sensitive to cleavage by DNase I. FAIRE-Seq is a successor of DNase-seq for the genome-wide identification of accessible DNA regions in the genome. Both the protocols for identifying open chromatin regions have biases depending on underlying nucleosome structure. For example, FAIRE-seq provides higher tag counts at non-promoter regions. On the other hand, DNase-seq signal is higher at promoter regions, and DNase-seq has been shown to have better sensitivity than FAIRE-seq even at non-promoter regions.

== DNase-seq Footprinting ==
DNase-seq requires some downstream bioinformatics analyses in order to provide genome-wide DNA footprints. The computational tools proposed can be categorized in two classes: segmentation-based and site-centric approaches. Segmentation-based methods are based on the application of Hidden Markov models or sliding window methods to segment the genome into open/closed chromatin region. Examples of such methods are: HINT, Boyle method and Neph method. Site-centric methods, on the other hand, find footprints given the open chromatin profile around motif-predicted binding sites, i.e., regulatory regions predicted using DNA-protein sequence information (encoded in structures such as Position weight matrix). Examples of these methods are CENTIPEDE and Cuellar-Partida method.
