= MethBase =

Content
- Description: Database for single cytosine resolution DNA methylation data and associated annotations.
- Organisms: Human; Chimpanzee; Gorilla; Rhesus Macaque; Mouse; Arabidopsis

Contact
- Laboratory: Andrew D. Smith
- Primary citation: Qiang Song et al. (2013)
- Release date: 2013

Access
- Data format: Trackhub on the UCSC Genome Browser
- Website: http://smithlabresearch.org/software/methbase/

MethBase is a database of DNA methylation data derived from next-generation sequencing data. MethBase provides a visualization of publicly available bisulfite sequencing and reduced representation bisulfite sequencing experiments through the UCSC Genome Browser. MethBase contents include single-CpG site resolution methylation levels for each CpG site in the genome of interest, annotation of regions of hypomethylation often associated with gene promoters, and annotation of allele-specific methylation associated with genomic imprinting.

== See also ==
- DNA methylation
- MethDB
- NGSmethDB
