= NGSmethDB =

Methylation data derived from next-generation sequencing data

Content
- Description: next-generation sequencing single-cytosine-resolution DNA methylation data.
- Organisms: human mouse Arabidopsis

Contact
- Primary citation: Michael Hackenberg & al. (2011)
- Release date: 2010

Access
- Website: http://bioinfo2.ugr.es/NGSmethDB/gbrowse/

NGSmethDB is a database of methylation data derived from next-generation sequencing data.

== See also ==
- DNA methylation
- MethBase
- MethDB
