= MethDB =

Content
- Description: DNA methylation data.

Contact
- Primary citation: PMID 11125109

Access
- Website: http://www.methdb.de

MethDB is a database for DNA methylation data. Descriptions of MethDB have been published in the database issues of the following:

- Nucleic Acids Research in 2001 and 2003 (reproduced with permission from NAR Online).
- The Journal of Nutrition in 2002
- 2006 in Epigenetics

== See also ==
- DNA methylation
- MethBase
- NGSmethDB
