= GLAD-PCR assay =

Glal hydrolysis and Ligation Adapter Dependent PCR assay (GLAD-PCR assay) is the novel method to determine R(5mC)GY sites produced in the course of de novo DNA methylation with DNMTЗA and DNMTЗB DNA methyltransferases. GLAD-PCR assay do not require bisulfite treatment of the DNA.

Method was specially designed to determine methylation of RCGY site of interest in human and mammalian genomes in excess of corresponding unmethylated sites. This is a typical situation for DNA preparations from clinical samples of blood and tissues.

GLAD-PCR assay is based on the new type of enzymes - site-specific methyl-directed DNA-endonucleases (MD DNA endonucleases). These enzymes are very similar to restriction enzymes in biochemical properties and cleave DNA completely, but act in opposite way: they cleave only methylated DNA and do not cleave unmethylated DNA at all.

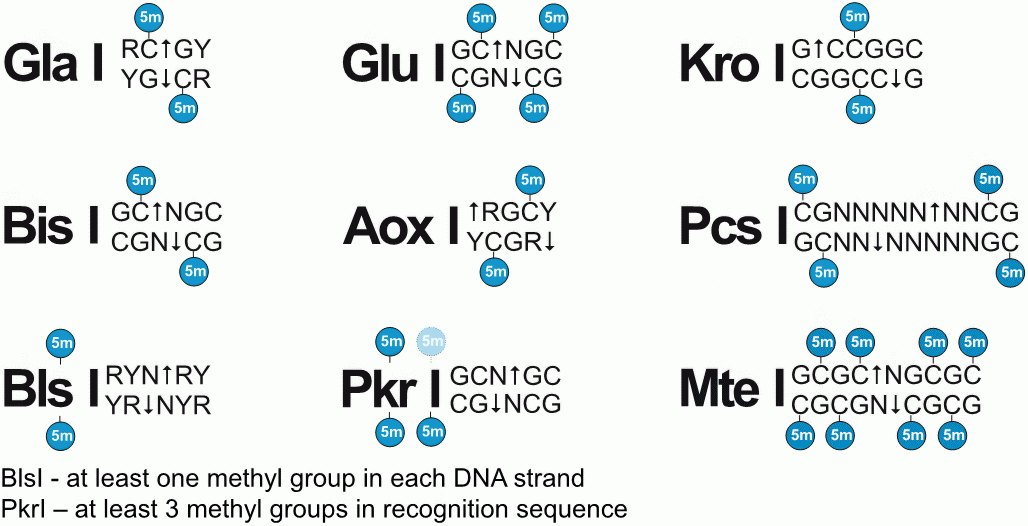
Recognition sites of available MD DNA Endonucleases

Mammalian DNA-methyltransferases DNMT1, DNMT3a and DNMT3b catalyze a reaction of DNA methylation.

- DNMT1 maintains DNA methylation pattern in vivo modifying a new strand after replication.
- DNMT3a and DNMT3b are responsible for DNA methylation de novo including abnormal hypermethylation in cancer cells.

It is well known that hypermethylation of CpG-islands in regulatory regions of promoter and/or first exon in a variety of genes often occurs at early stages of sporadic carcinogenesis. This leads to downregulation of the genes expression in tumor cells, whereas in a healthy tissue the corresponding genes remain to be active. Thus, the detection of such epigenetic biomarkers is one of the most promising diagnostic and prognostic tools

Study of DNMT3a and DNMT3b substrate specificity has shown that both enzymes predominantly recognize RCGY site and modify internal CG-dinucleotide to form 5’-R(5mC)GY-3’/3’-YG(5mC) R-5’ sequence. One of new enzymes GlaI recognizes and cleaves site R(5mC)GY. Due to this unique substrate specificity, GlaI is a convenient tool for identification of de novo methylated sites in the human and mammalian DNA.

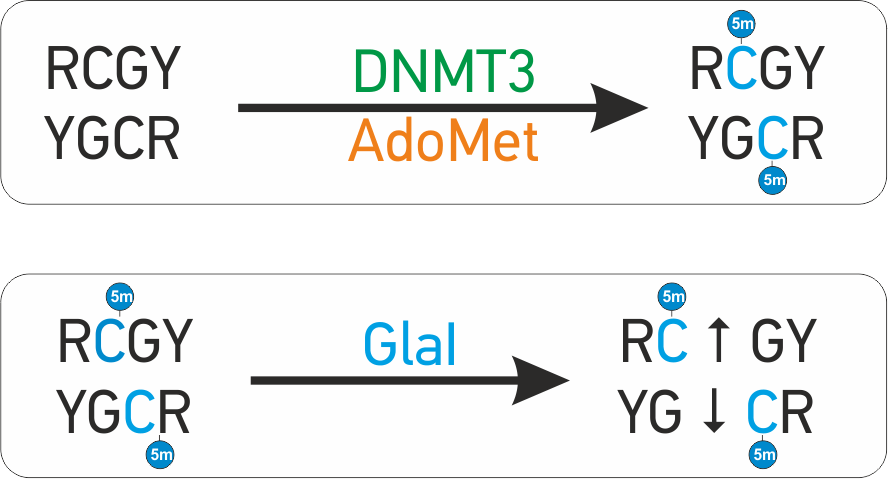
DNMT3 and GLAI equal specificity

GLAD-PCR assay includes 3 simple steps:

1. GlaI hydrolysis of the studied DNA. At this step only R(5mC)GY sites are hydrolyzed. Unmethylated RCGY sites remain uncut.
2. The universal adapter ligation. As an adapter an oligonucleotide duplex 5’-CCTGCTCTTTCATCG-3’/3’-pGGACGAGAAAGTAGCp-5’ is used, where “p” means phosphate.
3. Subsequent real-time PCR with Taqman probe. Genome primer and TaqMan probe are designed for DNA region of interest, another hybrid primer consist of two parts: one part is complementary to the universal adapter and another one - to the DNA at the point of GlaI hydrolysis.
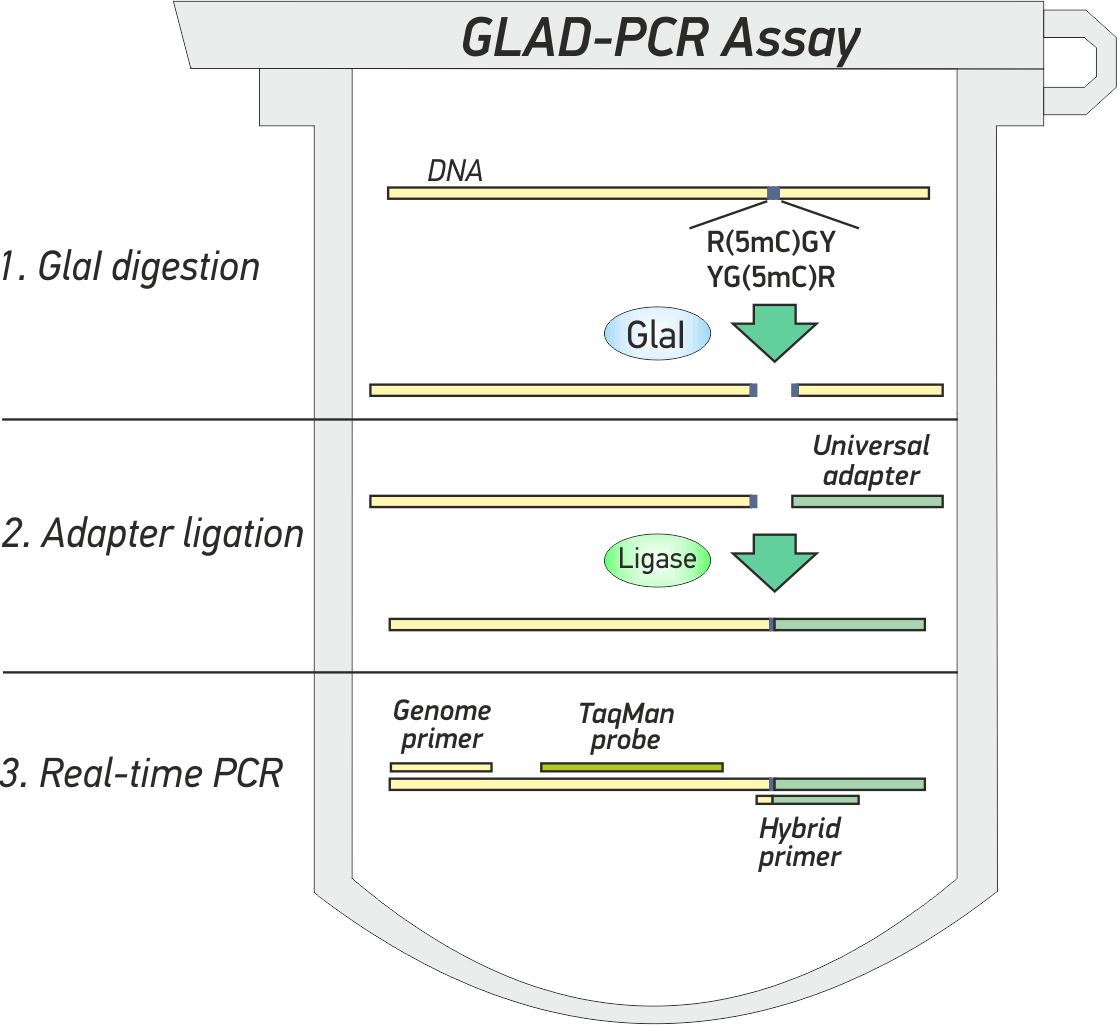
  GLAD-PCR assay

Assay is performed in one tube, takes about 2–3 hours and determines even several copies of DNA with R(5mC)GY site of interest.
