= Decrease in DNA Methylation I =

Plant gene

Decreased DNA Methylation I (DDM1), is a plant gene that encodes a nucleosome remodeler which facilitates DNA methylation. The DDM1 gene has been described extensively in Arabidopsis thaliana and also in maize. The protein has been described to be similar to the SWI2/SNF2 chromatin remodeling proteins.

Since DNA methylation occurs mostly in transposable elements (TE), DDM1 is thought to be a crucial function in silencing TEs.

== Arabidopsis thaliana (A. thaliana) ==
DDM1 is required for DNA methylation in highly heterochromatin transposable elements. DDM1, therefore, often silences transposable elements but the mutation in Arabidopsis thaliana is not embryo lethal. DDM1 mutants have also

== Maize ==
DDM1 is being further explored in maize. Unlike A. thaliana, maize has two copies of the gene: CHR101 and CHR106. In maize, the double mutant of DDM1 is embryo lethal. However, other studies are using the heterozygote mutant. The maize genome is 80% transposons so DDM1 function is quite important.

== See also ==
- DNA methylation
- DNA demethylation
