= Cell-free RNA =

RNA molecules found outside of cells, typically in bodily fluids

Circulating cell-free RNA or cfRNA refers to freely-circulating ribonucleic acid molecules in various biological fluids such as blood (both plasma and serum), urine, cerebrospinal fluid (CSF), saliva, and pleural fluid. These extracellular RNA molecules are distinct from the intracellular RNA that performs its functions within the confines of cellular membranes and is released from cells by active secretion or through apoptosis and necrosis. cfRNA is considered a significant component of the broader class of molecules known as extracellular RNA (exRNA). In recent years, cfRNA has been considered as a potential non-invasive biomarker in liquid biopsy applications, providing an avenue for diagnosing, monitoring, and predicting the course of a wide array of physiological and pathological conditions.

== See also ==
- cfDNA
- Liquid biopsy
- RNA
