= Restriction landmark genomic scanning =

Genome analysis method

Restriction landmark genomic scanning (RLGS) is a genome analysis method for rapid simultaneous visualization of thousands of landmarks, or restriction sites. Using a combination of restriction enzymes some of which are specific to DNA modifications, the technique can be used to visualize differences in methylation levels across the genome of a given organism. RLGS employs direct labeling of DNA, which is first cut by a specific series of restriction enzymes, and then labeled by a radioactive isotope (usually phosphorus-32). A two-dimensional electrophoresis process is then employed, yielding high-resolution results. The radioactive second-dimension gel is then allowed to expose a large sheet of film. The radiation produced by the radioactive labeling will cause the film to be exposed wherever the restriction fragments have migrated during electrophoresis. The film is then developed, yielding a visual representation of the results in the form of an autoradiograph. The same combination of restriction enzymes will produce the same pattern of 'spots' from samples from the same organisms, but different patterns for different types of organism. For example, human and mouse DNA will produce distinctly different patterns when treated with the same combination of enzymes. These finished auto-rads can be examined against each other, revealing any changes in gene expression that lead to visual differences in the film. Each autoradiograph contains thousands of spots, each corresponding to a labeled DNA restriction landmark.

RLGS becomes useful when doing whole-genome scans, and can effectively do the work of thousands of polymerase chain reactions at once. It readily detects alterations deviating from normal, and thus is exceptionally effective in identifying hyper/hypomethylation in tumors, deletions or amplifications of genes, or simply changes in gene expression throughout the development of an organism.

== Sources ==
- Hayashizaki, Yoshihide; Hirotsune, Shinji; Okazaki, Yasushi; Hatada, Izuho; Shibata, Hideo; Kawai, Jun; Hirose, Kenji; Watanabe, Sachihiko; Fushiki, Shinji; Wada, Seiji; Sugimoto, Toshikado; Kobayakawa, Kiyoshi; Kawara, Tsutomu; Katsuki, Motoya; Shibuya, Tohru; Mukai, Tsunehiro (Apr 1993). "Restriction landmark genomic scanning method and its various applications". Electrophoresis. 14 (4): 251–8. doi:10.1002/elps.1150140145. PMID 8388788. S2CID 22161587.
- http://www.informatics.jax.org/searches/accession_report.cgi?id=MGI:71287
- a picture of an auto-rad from Roswell Park Comprehensive Cancer Center
