= DNA methylation =

Biological process

Methyl group (H_{3}C) added to a nucleobase (cytosine)

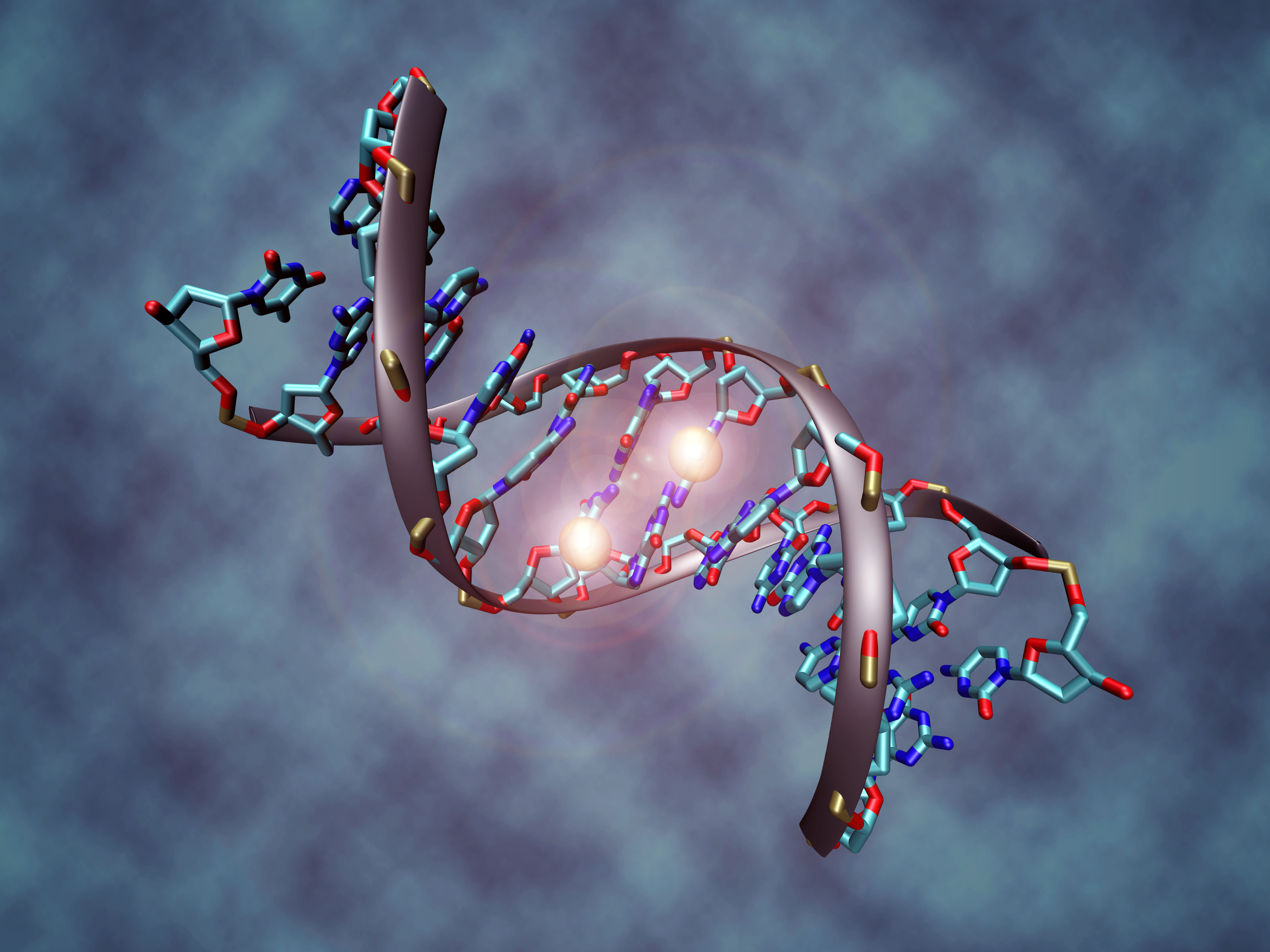
Representation of a DNA molecule that is methylated. The two white spheres represent methyl groups. They are bound to two cytosine nucleotide molecules that make up the DNA sequence.

DNA methylation is a biological process by which methyl groups are added to the DNA molecule. Methylation can change the activity of a DNA segment without changing the sequence. When located in a gene promoter, DNA methylation typically acts to repress gene transcription. In mammals, DNA methylation is essential for normal development and is associated with a number of key processes including genomic imprinting, X-chromosome inactivation, repression of transposable elements, aging, and carcinogenesis.

== Forms ==
As of 2016, two nucleobases have been found on which natural, enzymatic DNA methylation takes place: adenine and cytosine. The modified bases are N^{6}-methyladenine, 5-methylcytosine and N^{4}-methylcytosine.

Unmodified base:
	Adenine, (A)	Cytosine, (C)
Modified forms:
	N6-Methyladenine (6mA)	5-Methylcytosine, (5mC)	N4-Methylcytosine (4mC)

Cytosine methylation is widespread in both eukaryotes and prokaryotes, even though the rate of cytosine DNA methylation can differ greatly between species: 14% of cytosines are methylated in Arabidopsis thaliana, 4% to 8% in Physarum, 7.6% in Mus musculus, 2.3% in Escherichia coli, 0.03% in Drosophila; methylation is essentially undetectable in Dictyostelium; and virtually absent (0.0002 to 0.0003%) from Caenorhabditis or fungi such as Saccharomyces cerevisiae and S. pombe (but not N. crassa). Adenine methylation has been observed in bacterial and plant DNA, and recently also in mammalian DNA, but has received considerably less attention.

Methylation of cytosine to form 5-methylcytosine occurs at the same 5 position on the pyrimidine ring where the DNA base thymine's methyl group is located; the same position distinguishes thymine from the analogous RNA base uracil, which has no methyl group. Spontaneous deamination of 5-methylcytosine converts it to thymine. This results in a T:G mismatch. Repair mechanisms then correct it back to the original C:G pair; alternatively, they may substitute A for G, turning the original C:G pair into a T:A pair, effectively changing a base and introducing a mutation. This misincorporated base will not be corrected during DNA replication as thymine is a DNA base. If the mismatch is not repaired and the cell enters the cell cycle the strand carrying the T will be complemented by an A in one of the daughter cells, such that the mutation becomes permanent. The near-universal use of thymine exclusively in DNA and uracil exclusively in RNA may have evolved as an error-control mechanism, to facilitate the removal of uracils generated by the spontaneous deamination of cytosine. DNA methylation as well as a number of its contemporary DNA methyltransferases (DNMT) have been thought to evolve from early world primitive RNA methylation activity and is supported by several lines of evidence.

In plants and other organisms, DNA methylation is found in three different sequence contexts: CG (or CpG), CHG or CHH (where H correspond to A, T or C). In mammals however, DNA methylation is almost exclusively found in CpG dinucleotides, with the cytosines on both strands being usually methylated. Non-CpG methylation can however be observed in embryonic stem cells, and has also been indicated in neural development. Furthermore, non-CpG methylation has also been observed in hematopoietic progenitor cells, and it occurred mainly in a CpApC sequence context.

== Conserved function of DNA methylation ==
Typical DNA methylation landscape in mammals

The DNA methylation landscape of vertebrates is particular compared to other organisms. In mammals, around 75% of CpG dinucleotides are methylated in somatic cells, and DNA methylation appears as a default state that has to be specifically excluded from defined locations. By contrast, the genome of most plants, invertebrates, fungi, or protists show "mosaic" methylation patterns, where only specific genomic elements are targeted, and they are characterized by the alternation of methylated and unmethylated domains.

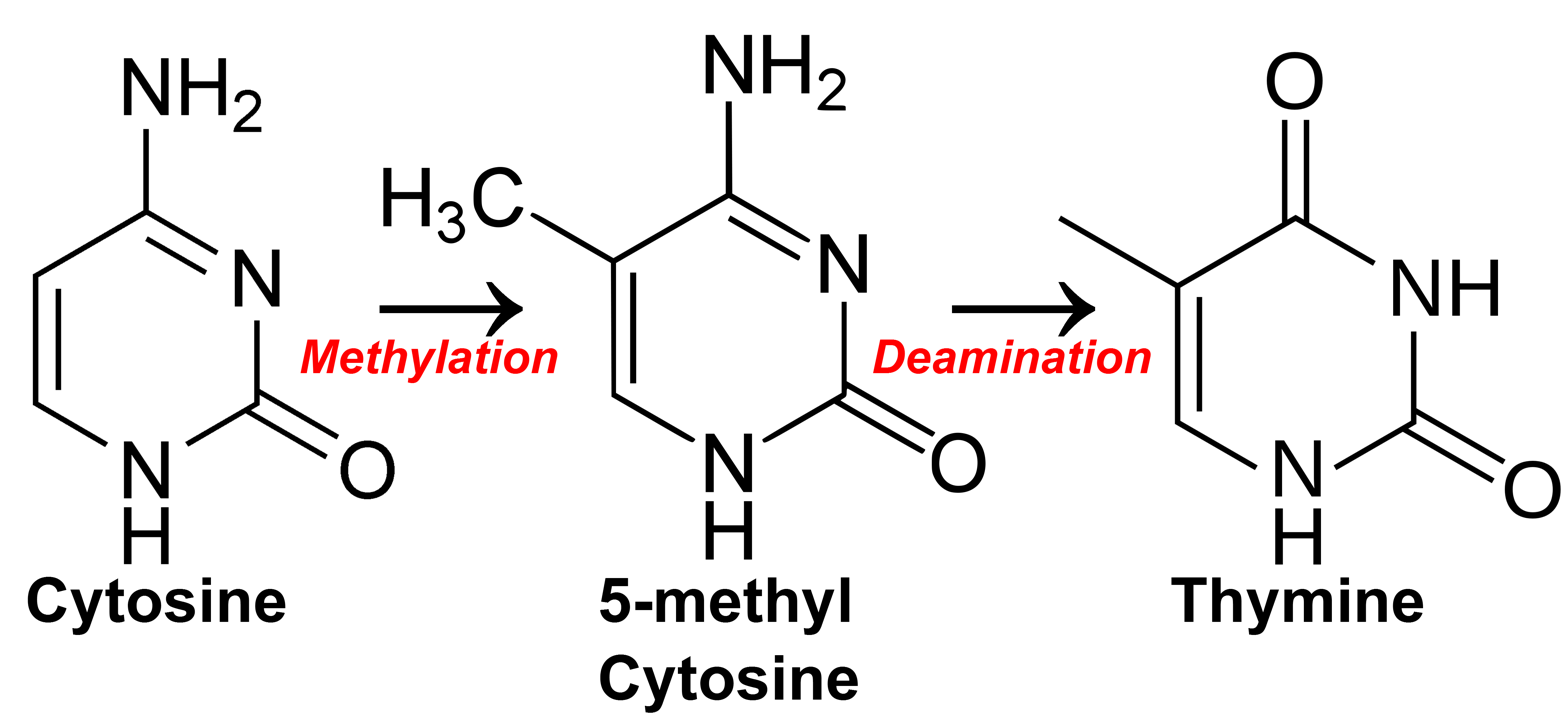
Cytosine methylation then deamination to thymine

High CpG methylation in mammalian genomes has an evolutionary cost because it increases the frequency of spontaneous mutations. Loss of amino-groups occurs with a high frequency for cytosines, with different consequences depending on their methylation. Methylated C residues spontaneously deaminate to form T residues over time; hence CpG dinucleotides steadily deaminate to TpG dinucleotides, which is evidenced by the under-representation of CpG dinucleotides in the human genome (they occur at only 21% of the expected frequency). (On the other hand, spontaneous deamination of unmethylated C residues gives rise to U residues, a change that is quickly recognized and repaired by the cell.)

=== CpG islands ===
In mammals, the only exception for this global CpG depletion resides in a specific category of GC- and CpG-rich sequences termed CpG islands that are generally unmethylated and therefore retained the expected CpG content. CpG islands are usually defined as regions with: 1) a length greater than 200bp, 2) a G+C content greater than 50%, 3) a ratio of observed to expected CpG greater than 0.6, although other definitions are sometimes used. Excluding repeated sequences, there are around 25,000 CpG islands in the human genome, 75% of which being less than 850bp long. They are major regulatory units and around 50% of CpG islands are located in gene promoter regions, while another 25% lie in gene bodies, often serving as alternative promoters. Reciprocally, around 60-70% of human genes have a CpG island in their promoter region. The majority of CpG islands are constitutively unmethylated and enriched for permissive chromatin modification such as H3K4 methylation. In somatic tissues, only 10% of CpG islands are methylated, the majority of them being located in intergenic and intragenic regions.

=== Repression of CpG-dense promoters ===
DNA methylation was probably present at some extent in early eukaryote ancestors. In virtually every organism analyzed, methylation in promoter regions correlates negatively with gene expression. CpG-dense promoters of actively transcribed genes are never methylated, but, reciprocally, transcriptionally silent genes do not necessarily carry a methylated promoter. In mouse and human, around 60–70% of genes have a CpG island in their promoter region and most of these CpG islands remain unmethylated independently of the transcriptional activity of the gene, in both differentiated and undifferentiated cell types. Of note, whereas DNA methylation of CpG islands is unambiguously linked with transcriptional repression, the function of DNA methylation in CG-poor promoters remains unclear; albeit there is little evidence that it could be functionally relevant.

DNA methylation may affect the transcription of genes in two ways. First, the methylation of DNA itself may physically impede the binding of transcriptional proteins to the gene, and second, and likely more important, methylated DNA may be bound by proteins known as methyl-CpG-binding domain proteins (MBDs). MBD proteins then recruit additional proteins to the locus, such as histone deacetylases and other chromatin remodeling proteins that can modify histones, thereby forming compact, inactive chromatin, termed heterochromatin. This link between DNA methylation and chromatin structure is important. In particular, loss of methyl-CpG-binding protein 2 (MeCP2) has been implicated in Rett syndrome; and methyl-CpG-binding domain protein 2 (MBD2) mediates the transcriptional silencing of hypermethylated genes in cancer.

=== Repression of transposable elements ===
DNA methylation is a powerful transcriptional repressor, at least in CpG dense contexts. Transcriptional repression of protein-coding genes appears essentially limited to specific classes of genes that need to be silent permanently and in almost all tissues. While DNA methylation does not have the flexibility required for the fine-tuning of gene regulation, its stability is perfect to ensure the permanent silencing of transposable elements. Transposon control is one of the most ancient functions of DNA methylation that is shared by animals, plants and multiple protists. It is even suggested that DNA methylation evolved precisely for this purpose.

=== Genome expansion ===
DNA methylation of transposable elements has been known to be related to genome expansion. However, the evolutionary driver for genome expansion remains unknown. There is a clear correlation between the size of the genome and CpG, suggesting that the DNA methylation of transposable elements led to a noticeable increase in the mass of DNA.

=== Methylation of the gene body of highly transcribed genes ===
A function that appears even more conserved than transposon silencing is positively correlated with gene expression. In almost all species where DNA methylation is present, DNA methylation is especially enriched in the body of highly transcribed genes. The function of gene body methylation is not well understood. A body of evidence suggests that it could regulate splicing and suppress the activity of intragenic transcriptional units (cryptic promoters or transposable elements). Gene-body methylation appears closely tied to H3K36 methylation. In yeast and mammals, H3K36 methylation is highly enriched in the body of highly transcribed genes. In yeast at least, H3K36me3 recruits enzymes such as histone deacetylases to condense chromatin and prevent the activation of cryptic start sites. In mammals, DNMT3a and DNMT3b PWWP domain binds to H3K36me3 and the two enzymes are recruited to the body of actively transcribed genes.

== In mammals ==
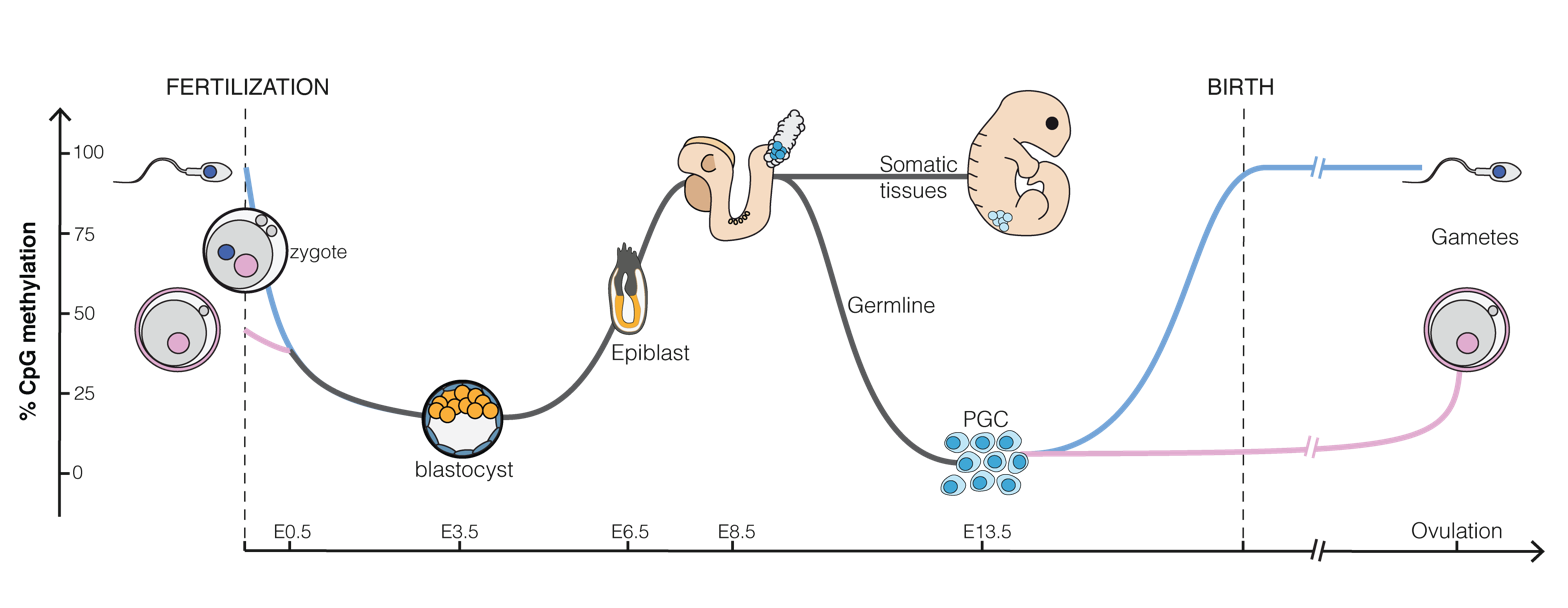
Dynamic of DNA methylation during mouse embryonic development. E3.5-E6, etc., refer to days after fertilization. PGC: primordial germ cells.

=== During embryonic development ===
DNA methylation patterns are largely erased and then re-established between generations in mammals. Almost all of the methylations from the parents are erased, first during gametogenesis, and again in early embryogenesis, with demethylation and remethylation occurring each time. Demethylation in early embryogenesis occurs in the preimplantation period in two stages – initially in the zygote, then during the first few embryonic replication cycles of morula and blastula. A wave of methylation then takes place during the implantation stage of the embryo, with CpG islands protected from methylation. This results in global repression and allows housekeeping genes to be expressed in all cells. In the post-implantation stage, methylation patterns are stage- and tissue-specific, with changes that would define each individual cell type lasting stably over a long period. Studies on rat limb buds during embryogenesis have further illustrated the dynamic nature of DNA methylation in development. In this context, variations in global DNA methylation were observed across different developmental stages and culture conditions, highlighting the intricate regulation of methylation during organogenesis and its potential implications for regenerative medicine strategies.

Whereas DNA methylation is not necessary per se for transcriptional silencing, it is thought nonetheless to represent a "locked" state that definitely inactivates transcription. In particular, DNA methylation appears critical for the maintenance of mono-allelic silencing in the context of genomic imprinting and X chromosome inactivation. In these cases, expressed and silent alleles differ by their methylation status, and loss of DNA methylation results in loss of imprinting and re-expression of Xist in somatic cells. During embryonic development, few genes change their methylation status, at the important exception of a number of genes specifically expressed in the germline. DNA methylation appears absolutely required in differentiated cells, as knockout of any of the three competent DNA methyltransferase results in embryonic or post-partum lethality. By contrast, DNA methylation is dispensable in undifferentiated cell types, such as the inner cell mass of the blastocyst, primordial germ cells or embryonic stem cells. Since DNA methylation appears to directly regulate only a limited number of genes, how precisely DNA methylation absence causes the death of differentiated cells remain an open question.

Due to the phenomenon of genomic imprinting, maternal and paternal genomes are differentially marked and must be properly reprogrammed every time they pass through the germline. Therefore, during gametogenesis, primordial germ cells must have their original biparental DNA methylation patterns erased and re-established based on the sex of the transmitting parent. After fertilization, the paternal and maternal genomes are once again demethylated and remethylated (except for differentially methylated regions associated with imprinted genes). This reprogramming is likely required for totipotency of the newly formed embryo and erasure of acquired epigenetic changes.

=== In cancer ===
Global hypomethylation is when methyl groups do not bond to CpG islands, causing an oncogene to be expressed when it otherwise should not be. In the diagram, cell 1 is cancer-free as it is not experiencing hypomethylation. Then, we see an example of hypomethylation where methyl groups do not bond, causing the expression of an oncogene and thus inducing cancer development. Methylation can also silence a tumor suppressor gene. In the diagram, we see that cell 3 is cancer-free, as there is no hypermethylation, meaning methyl groups are not actively bound and silencing a tumor suppressor gene. In cell 4, it is cancerous due to hypermethylation, causing the tumor suppressor gene to not be expressed.

In multiple disease processes, such as cancer, gene promoter CpG islands acquire abnormal hypermethylation, which results in transcriptional silencing that can be inherited by daughter cells following cell division. Alterations of DNA methylation have been recognized as an important component of cancer development. Hypomethylation, in general, arises earlier and is linked to chromosomal instability and loss of imprinting, whereas hypermethylation is associated with promoters and can arise secondary to gene (oncogene suppressor) silencing, but might be a target for epigenetic therapy. In developmental contexts, dynamic changes in DNA methylation patterns also have significant implications. For instance, in rat limb buds, shifts in methylation status were associated with different stages of chondrogenesis, suggesting a potential link between DNA methylation and the progression of certain developmental processes.

Global hypomethylation has also been implicated in the development and progression of cancer through different mechanisms. Typically, there is hypermethylation of tumor suppressor genes and hypomethylation of oncogenes.

Generally, in progression to cancer, hundreds of genes are silenced or activated. Although silencing of some genes in cancers occurs by mutation, a large proportion of carcinogenic gene silencing is a result of altered DNA methylation (see DNA methylation in cancer). DNA methylation causing silencing in cancer typically occurs at multiple CpG sites in the CpG islands that are present in the promoters of protein coding genes.

Altered expressions of microRNAs also silence or activate multiple genes in progression to cancer (see microRNAs in cancer). Altered microRNA expression occurs through hyper/hypo-methylation of CpG sites in CpG islands in promoters controlling transcription of the microRNAs.

Silencing of DNA repair genes through methylation of CpG islands in their promoters appears to be especially important in progression to cancer (see methylation of DNA repair genes in cancer).

=== In atherosclerosis ===
Epigenetic modifications such as DNA methylation have been implicated in cardiovascular disease, including atherosclerosis. In animal models of atherosclerosis, vascular tissue, as well as blood cells such as mononuclear blood cells, exhibit global hypomethylation with gene-specific areas of hypermethylation. DNA methylation polymorphisms may be used as an early biomarker of atherosclerosis since they are present before lesions are observed, which may provide an early tool for detection and risk prevention.

Two of the cell types targeted for DNA methylation polymorphisms are monocytes and lymphocytes, which experience an overall hypomethylation. One proposed mechanism behind this global hypomethylation is elevated homocysteine levels causing hyperhomocysteinemia, a known risk factor for cardiovascular disease. High plasma levels of homocysteine inhibit DNA methyltransferases, which causes hypomethylation. Hypomethylation of DNA affects genes that alter smooth muscle cell proliferation, cause endothelial cell dysfunction, and increase inflammatory mediators, all of which are critical in forming atherosclerotic lesions. High levels of homocysteine also result in hypermethylation of CpG islands in the promoter region of the estrogen receptor alpha (ERα) gene, causing its down regulation. ERα protects against atherosclerosis due to its action as a growth suppressor, causing the smooth muscle cells to remain in a quiescent state. Hypermethylation of the ERα promoter thus allows intimal smooth muscle cells to proliferate excessively and contribute to the development of the atherosclerotic lesion.

Another gene that experiences a change in methylation status in atherosclerosis is the monocarboxylate transporter (MCT3), which produces a protein responsible for the transport of lactate and other ketone bodies out of a number of cell types, including vascular smooth muscle cells. In atherosclerosis patients, there is an increase in methylation of the CpG islands in exon 2, which decreases MCT3 protein expression. The downregulation of MCT3 impairs lactate transport and significantly increases smooth muscle cell proliferation, which further contributes to the atherosclerotic lesion. An ex vivo experiment using the demethylating agent Decitabine (5-aza-2 -deoxycytidine) was shown to induce MCT3 expression in a dose dependent manner, as all hypermethylated sites in the exon 2 CpG island became demethylated after treatment. This may serve as a novel therapeutic agent to treat atherosclerosis, although no human studies have been conducted thus far.

=== In heart failure ===
In addition to atherosclerosis described above, specific epigenetic changes have been identified in the failing human heart. This may vary by disease etiology. For example, in ischemic heart failure DNA methylation changes have been linked to changes in gene expression that may direct gene expression associated with the changes in heart metabolism known to occur. Additional forms of heart failure (e.g. diabetic cardiomyopathy) and co-morbidities (e.g. obesity) must be explored to see how common these mechanisms are. Most strikingly, in failing human heart these changes in DNA methylation are associated with racial and socioeconomic status which further impact how gene expression is altered, and may influence how the individual's heart failure should be treated.

=== In aging ===
In humans and other mammals, DNA methylation levels can be used to accurately estimate the age of tissues and cell types, forming an accurate epigenetic clock.

A longitudinal study of twin children showed that, between the ages of 5 and 10, there was divergence of methylation patterns due to environmental rather than genetic influences. There is a global loss of DNA methylation during aging.

In a study that analyzed the complete DNA methylomes of CD4^{+} T cells in a newborn, a 26 years old individual and a 103 years old individual were observed that the loss of methylation is proportional to age. Hypomethylated CpGs observed in the centenarian DNAs compared with the neonates covered all genomic compartments (promoters, intergenic, intronic and exonic regions). However, some genes become hypermethylated with age, including genes for the estrogen receptor, p16, insulin-like growth factor 2, ELOVL2 and FHL2

=== In exercise ===
High intensity exercise has been shown to result in reduced DNA methylation in skeletal muscle. Promoter methylation of PGC-1α and PDK4 were immediately reduced after high intensity exercise, whereas PPAR-δ methylation was not reduced until three hours after exercise. At the same time, six months of exercise in previously sedentary middle-age men resulted in increased methylation in adipose tissue. One study showed a possible increase in global genomic DNA methylation of white blood cells with more physical activity in non-Hispanics.

=== In B-cell differentiation ===
A study that investigated the methylome of B cells along their differentiation cycle, using whole-genome bisulfite sequencing (WGBS), showed that there is a hypomethylation from the earliest stages to the most differentiated stages. The largest methylation difference is between the stages of germinal center B cells and memory B cells. Furthermore, this study showed that there is a similarity between B cell tumors and long-lived B cells in their DNA methylation signatures.

=== In the brain ===
Two reviews summarize evidence that DNA methylation alterations in brain neurons are important in learning and memory. Contextual fear conditioning (a form of associative learning) in animals, such as mice and rats, is rapid and is extremely robust in creating memories. In mice and in rats contextual fear conditioning, within 1–24 hours, it is associated with altered methylations of several thousand DNA cytosines in genes of hippocampus neurons. Twenty four hours after contextual fear conditioning, 9.2% of the genes in rat hippocampus neurons are differentially methylated. In mice, when examined at four weeks after conditioning, the hippocampus methylations and demethylations had been reset to the original naive conditions. The hippocampus is needed to form memories, but memories are not stored there. For such mice, at four weeks after contextual fear conditioning, substantial differential CpG methylations and demethylations occurred in cortical neurons during memory maintenance, and there were 1,223 differentially methylated genes in their anterior cingulate cortex. Mechanisms guiding new DNA methylations and new DNA demethylations in the hippocampus during memory establishment were summarized in 2022. That review also indicated the mechanisms by which the new patterns of methylation gave rise to new patterns of messenger RNA expression. These new messenger RNAs were then transported by messenger RNP particles (neuronal granules) to synapses of the neurons, where they could be translated into proteins. Active changes in neuronal DNA methylation and demethylation appear to act as controllers of synaptic scaling and glutamate receptor trafficking in learning and memory formation.

== DNA methyltransferases (in mammals) ==
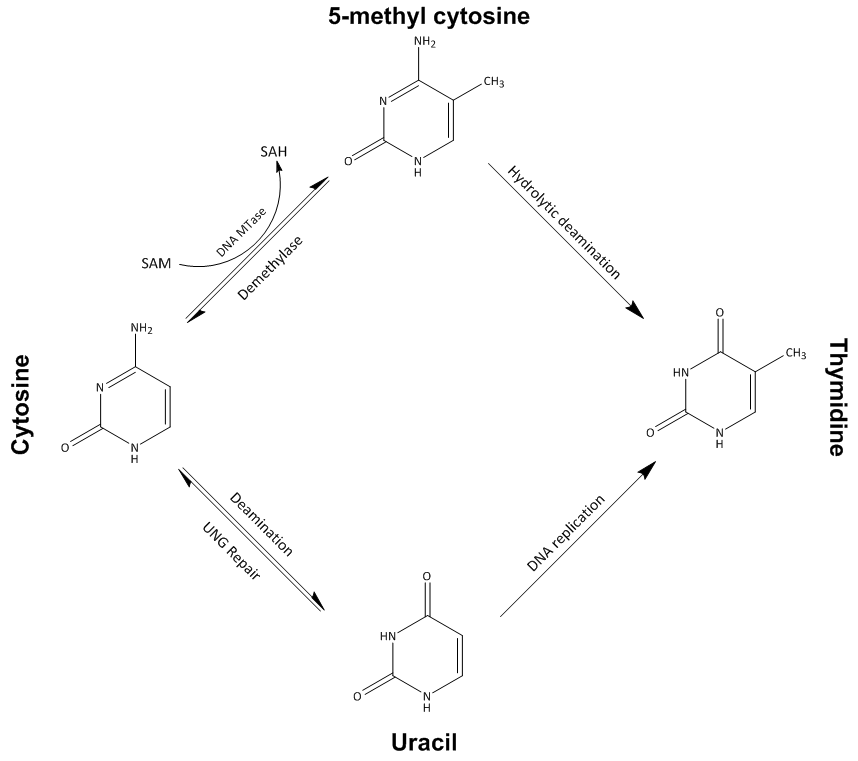
Possible pathways of cytosine methylation and demethylation. Abbreviations: S-Adenosyl-L-homocysteine (SAH), S-adenosyl-L-methionine (SAM), DNA methyltransferase (DNA MTase), Uracil-DNA glycosylase (UNG)

In mammalian cells, DNA methylation occurs mainly at the C5 position of CpG dinucleotides and is carried out by two general classes of enzymatic activities – maintenance methylation and de novo methylation.

Maintenance methylation activity is necessary to preserve DNA methylation after every cellular DNA replication cycle. Without the DNA methyltransferase (DNMT), the replication machinery itself would produce daughter strands that are unmethylated and, over time, would lead to passive demethylation. DNMT1 is the proposed maintenance methyltransferase that is responsible for copying DNA methylation patterns to the daughter strands during DNA replication. Mouse models with both copies of DNMT1 deleted are embryonic lethal at approximately day 9, due to the requirement of DNMT1 activity for development in mammalian cells.

It is thought that DNMT3A and DNMT3B are the de novo methyltransferases that set up DNA methylation patterns early in development. DNMT3L is a protein that is homologous to the other DNMT3s but has no catalytic activity. Instead, DNMT3L assists the de novo methyltransferases by increasing their ability to bind to DNA and stimulating their activity. Mice and rats have a third functional de novo methyltransferase enzyme named DNMT3C, which evolved as a paralog of Dnmt3b by tandem duplication in the common ancestral of Muroidea rodents. DNMT3C catalyzes the methylation of promoters of transposable elements during early spermatogenesis, an activity shown to be essential for their epigenetic repression and male fertility. It is yet unclear if other mammals that do not have DNMT3C (like humans) rely on DNMT3B or DNMT3A for de novo methylation of transposable elements in the germline. Finally, DNMT2 (TRDMT1) has been identified as a DNA methyltransferase homolog, containing all 10 sequence motifs common to all DNA methyltransferases; however, DNMT2 (TRDMT1) does not methylate DNA but instead methylates cytosine-38 in the anticodon loop of aspartic acid transfer RNA.

Since some tumor suppressor genes are silenced by DNA methylation during carcinogenesis, there have been attempts to re-express these genes by inhibiting the DNMTs. 5-Aza-2'-deoxycytidine (decitabine) is a nucleoside analog that inhibits DNMTs by trapping them in a covalent complex on DNA by preventing the β-elimination step of catalysis, thus resulting in the enzymes' degradation. However, for decitabine to be active, it must be incorporated into the genome of the cell, which can cause mutations in the daughter cells if the cell does not die. In addition, decitabine is toxic to the bone marrow, which limits the size of its therapeutic window. These pitfalls have led to the development of antisense RNA therapies that target the DNMTs by degrading their mRNAs and preventing their translation. However, it is currently unclear whether targeting DNMT1 alone is sufficient to reactivate tumor suppressor genes silenced by DNA methylation.

== In plants ==
Significant progress has been made in understanding DNA methylation in the model plant Arabidopsis thaliana. DNA methylation in plants differs from that of mammals: while DNA methylation in mammals mainly occurs on the cytosine nucleotide in a CpG site, in plants the cytosine can be methylated at CpG, CpHpG, and CpHpH sites, where H represents any nucleotide but not guanine. Overall, Arabidopsis DNA is highly methylated, mass spectrometry analysis estimated 14% of cytosines to be modified. Later, bisulfite sequencing data estimated that around 25% of Arabidopsis CG sites are methylated, but these levels vary based on the geographic location of Arabidopsis accessions (plants in the north are more highly methylated than southern accessions).

The principal Arabidopsis DNA methyltransferase enzymes, which transfer and covalently attach methyl groups onto DNA, are DRM2, MET1, and CMT3. Both the DRM2 and MET1 proteins share significant homology to the mammalian methyltransferases DNMT3 and DNMT1, respectively, whereas the CMT3 protein is unique to the plant kingdom. There are currently two classes of DNA methyltransferases: 1) the de novo class or enzymes that create new methylation marks on the DNA; 2) a maintenance class that recognizes the methylation marks on the parental strand of DNA and transfers new methylation to the daughter strands after DNA replication. DRM2 is the only enzyme that has been implicated as a de novo DNA methyltransferase. DRM2 has also been shown, along with MET1 and CMT3 to be involved in maintaining methylation marks through DNA replication. Other DNA methyltransferases are expressed in plants but have no known function (see the Chromatin Database).

Genome-wide levels of DNA methylation vary widely between plant species, and Arabidopsis cytosines tend to be less densely methylated than those in other plants. For example, ~92.5% of CpG cytosines are methylated in Beta vulgaris. The patterns of methylation also differ between cytosine sequence contexts; universally, CpG methylation is higher than CHG and CHH methylation, and CpG methylation can be found in both active genes and transposable elements, while CHG and CHH are usually relegated to silenced transposable elements.

It is not clear how the cell determines the locations of de novo DNA methylation, but evidence suggests that for some locations, RNA-directed DNA methylation (RdDM) is involved. In RdDM, specific RNA transcripts are produced from a genomic DNA template, and this RNA forms secondary structures called double-stranded RNA molecules. The double-stranded RNAs, through either the small interfering RNA (siRNA) or microRNA (miRNA) pathways direct de-novo DNA methylation of the original genomic location that produced the RNA. This sort of mechanism is thought to be important in cellular defense against RNA viruses and/or transposons, both of which often form a double-stranded RNA that can be mutagenic to the host genome. By methylating their genomic locations, through an as yet poorly understood mechanism, they are shut off and are no longer active in the cell, protecting the genome from their mutagenic effect. Recently, it was described that methylation of the DNA is the main determinant of embryogenic cultures formation from explants in woody plants and is regarded the main mechanism that explains the poor response of mature explants to somatic embryogenesis in the plants (Isah 2016).

== In insects ==
Diverse orders of insects show varied patterns of DNA methylation, from almost undetectable levels in flies to low levels in butterflies and higher in true bugs and some cockroaches (up to 14% of all CG sites in Blattella asahinai).

Functional DNA methylation has been discovered in Honey Bees. DNA methylation marks are mainly on the gene body, and current opinions on the function of DNA methylation is gene regulation via alternative splicing

DNA methylation levels in Drosophila melanogaster are nearly undetectable. Sensitive methods applied to Drosophila DNA suggest levels in the range of 0.1–0.3% of total cytosine. A 2014 study found that the low level of methylation in fruit flies appeared "at specific short motifs and is independent of DNMT2 activity." Further, highly sensitive mass spectrometry approaches, have now demonstrated the presence of low (0.07%) but significant levels of adenine methylation during the earliest stages of Drosophila embryogenesis.

== In fungi ==
Many fungi have low levels (0.1 to 0.5%) of cytosine methylation, whereas other fungi have as much as 5% of the genome methylated. This value seems to vary both among species and among isolates of the same species. There is also evidence that DNA methylation may be involved in state-specific control of gene expression in fungi. However, at a detection limit of 250 attomoles by using ultra-high sensitive mass spectrometry DNA methylation was not confirmed in single cellular yeast species such as Saccharomyces cerevisiae or Schizosaccharomyces pombe, indicating that yeasts do not possess this DNA modification.

Although brewers' yeast (Saccharomyces), fission yeast (Schizosaccharomyces), and Aspergillus flavus have no detectable DNA methylation, the model filamentous fungus Neurospora crassa has a well-characterized methylation system. Several genes control methylation in Neurospora and mutation of the DNA methyl transferase, dim-2, eliminates all DNA methylation but does not affect growth or sexual reproduction. While the Neurospora genome has little repeated DNA, half of the methylation occurs in repeated DNA including transposon relics and centromeric DNA. The ability to evaluate other important phenomena in a DNA methylase-deficient genetic background makes Neurospora an important system in which to study DNA methylation.

== In other eukaryotes ==
DNA methylation is largely absent from Dictyostelium discoideum where it appears to occur at about 0.006% of cytosines. In contrast, DNA methylation is widely distributed in Physarum polycephalum where 5-methylcytosine makes up as much as 8% of total cytosine

== In bacteria ==
All methylations in a prokaryote. In some prokaryotic organisms, all three previously known DNA methylation types are represented (N4-methylcytosine: m4C, 5-methylcytosine: m5C and N6-methyladenine: m6A). Six examples are shown here, two of which belong to the Archaea domain and four of which belong to the Bacteria domain. The information comes from Blow et al. (2016). In the left column are the species names of the organisms, to the right there are examples of methylated DNA motifs.

Adenine or cytosine methylation are mediated by restriction modification systems of a number of bacteria, in which specific DNA sequences are methylated periodically throughout the genome. A methylase is the enzyme that recognizes a specific sequence and methylates one of the bases in or near that sequence. Foreign DNAs (which are not methylated in this manner) that are introduced into the cell are degraded by sequence-specific restriction enzymes and cleaved. Bacterial genomic DNA is not recognized by these restriction enzymes. The methylation of native DNA acts as a sort of primitive immune system, allowing the bacteria to protect themselves from infection by bacteriophage.

E. coli DNA adenine methyltransferase (Dam) is an enzyme of ~32 kDa that does not belong to a restriction/modification system. The target recognition sequence for E. coli Dam is GATC, as the methylation occurs at the N6 position of the adenine in this sequence (G meATC). The three base pairs flanking each side of this site also influence DNA–Dam binding. Dam plays several key roles in bacterial processes, including mismatch repair, the timing of DNA replication, and gene expression. As a result of DNA replication, the status of GATC sites in the E. coli genome changes from fully methylated to hemimethylated. This is because adenine introduced into the new DNA strand is unmethylated. Re-methylation occurs within two to four seconds, during which time replication errors in the new strand are repaired. Methylation, or its absence, is the marker that allows the repair apparatus of the cell to differentiate between the template and nascent strands. It has been shown that altering Dam activity in bacteria results in an increased spontaneous mutation rate. Bacterial viability is compromised in dam mutants that also lack certain other DNA repair enzymes, providing further evidence for the role of Dam in DNA repair.

One region of the DNA that keeps its hemimethylated status for longer is the origin of replication, which has an abundance of GATC sites. This is central to the bacterial mechanism for timing DNA replication. SeqA binds to the origin of replication, sequestering it and thus preventing methylation. Because hemimethylated origins of replication are inactive, this mechanism limits DNA replication to once per cell cycle.

Expression of certain genes, for example, those coding for pilus expression in E. coli, is regulated by the methylation of GATC sites in the promoter region of the gene operon. The cells' environmental conditions just after DNA replication determine whether Dam is blocked from methylating a region proximal to or distal from the promoter region. Once the pattern of methylation has been created, the pilus gene transcription is locked in the on or off position until the DNA is again replicated. In E. coli, these pili operons have important roles in virulence in urinary tract infections. It has been proposed that inhibitors of Dam may function as antibiotics.

On the other hand, DNA cytosine methylase targets CCAGG and CCTGG sites to methylate cytosine at the C5 position (C meC(A/T) GG). The other methylase enzyme, EcoKI, causes methylation of adenines in the sequences AAC(N_{6})GTGC and GCAC(N_{6})GTT.

In Clostridioides difficile, DNA methylation at the target motif CAAAAA was shown to impact sporulation, a key step in disease transmission, as well as cell length, biofilm formation and host colonization.

=== Molecular cloning ===
Most strains used by molecular biologists are derivatives of E. coli K-12, and possess both Dam and Dcm, but there are commercially available strains that are dam-/dcm- (lack of activity of either methylase). In fact, it is possible to unmethylate the DNA extracted from dam+/dcm+ strains by transforming it into dam-/dcm- strains. This would help digest sequences that are not being recognized by methylation-sensitive restriction enzymes.

The restriction enzyme DpnI can recognize 5'-GmeATC-3' sites and digest the methylated DNA. Being such a short motif, it occurs frequently in sequences by chance, and as such its primary use for researchers is to degrade template DNA following PCRs (PCR products lack methylation, as no methylases are present in the reaction). Similarly, some commercially available restriction enzymes are sensitive to methylation at their cognate restriction sites and must as mentioned previously be used on DNA passed through a dam-/dcm- strain to allow cutting.

== Detection ==
DNA methylation can be detected by the following assays currently used in scientific research:

- Mass spectrometry is a sensitive and reliable analytical method to detect DNA methylation. MS, in general, is however not informative about the sequence context of the methylation, thus limited in studying the function of this DNA modification.
- Methylation-specific PCR (MSP), which is based on a chemical reaction of sodium bisulfite with DNA that converts unmethylated cytosines of CpG dinucleotides to uracil or UpG, followed by traditional PCR. However, methylated cytosines will not be converted in this process, and primers are designed to overlap the CpG site of interest, which allows one to determine methylation status as methylated or unmethylated.
- Whole genome bisulfite sequencing, also known as BS-Seq, which is a high-throughput genome-wide analysis of DNA methylation. It is based on the aforementioned sodium bisulfite conversion of genomic DNA, which is then sequenced on a Next-generation sequencing platform. The sequences obtained are then re-aligned to the reference genome to determine the methylation status of CpG dinucleotides based on mismatches resulting from the conversion of unmethylated cytosines into uracil.
- Enzymatic methyl-seq (EM-seq) works similarly to bisulfite sequencing, but uses enzymes, APOBEC and TET2, to deaminate unmethylated cytosine into uracil prior to sequencing. EM-seq libraries are less prone to DNA damage than bisulfite-treated libraries.
- Reduced representation bisulfite sequencing, also known as RRBS knows several working protocols. The first RRBS protocol was called RRBS and aims for around 10% of the methylome, a reference genome is needed. Later came more protocols that were able to sequence a smaller portion of the genome and higher sample multiplexing. EpiGBS was the first protocol where you could multiplex 96 samples in one lane of Illumina sequencing and were a reference genome was no longer needed. A de novo reference construction from the Watson and Crick reads made population screening of SNP's and SMP's simultaneously a fact.
- The HELP assay, which is based on restriction enzymes' differential ability to recognize and cleave methylated and unmethylated CpG DNA sites.
- GLAD-PCR assay, which is based on a new type of enzymes – site-specific methyl-directed DNA endonucleases, which hydrolyze only methylated DNA.
- ChIP-on-chip assays, which is based on the ability of commercially prepared antibodies to bind to DNA methylation-associated proteins like MeCP2.
- Restriction landmark genomic scanning, a complicated and now rarely used assay based upon restriction enzymes' differential recognition of methylated and unmethylated CpG sites; the assay is similar in concept to the HELP assay.
- Methylated DNA immunoprecipitation (MeDIP), analogous to chromatin immunoprecipitation, immunoprecipitation is used to isolate methylated DNA fragments for input into DNA detection methods such as DNA microarrays (MeDIP-chip) or DNA sequencing (MeDIP-seq).
- Pyrosequencing of bisulfite treated DNA. This is the sequencing of an amplicon made by a normal forward primer but a biotinylated reverse primer to PCR the gene of choice. The Pyrosequencer then analyses the sample by denaturing the DNA and adding one nucleotide at a time to the mix according to a sequence given by the user. If there is a mismatch, it is recorded and the percentage of DNA for which the mismatch is present is noted. This gives the user a percentage of methylation per CpG island.
- Molecular break light assay for DNA adenine methyltransferase activity – an assay that relies on the specificity of the restriction enzyme DpnI for fully methylated (adenine methylation) GATC sites in an oligonucleotide labeled with a fluorophore and quencher. The adenine methyltransferase methylates the oligonucleotide making it a substrate for DpnI. Cutting of the oligonucleotide by DpnI gives rise to a fluorescence increase.
- Methyl Sensitive Southern Blotting is similar to the HELP assay, although uses Southern blotting techniques to probe gene-specific differences in methylation using restriction digests. This technique is used to evaluate local methylation near the binding site for the probe.
- MethylCpG binding proteins (MBPs) and fusion proteins containing just the Methyl Binding Domain (MBD) are used to separate native DNA into methylated and unmethylated fractions. The percentage methylation of individual CpG islands can be determined by quantifying the amount of the target in each fraction. Extremely sensitive detection can be achieved in FFPE tissues with abscription-based detection.
- High resolution melt analysis (HRM or HRMA), is a post-PCR analytical technique. The target DNA is treated with sodium bisulfite, which chemically converts unmethylated cytosines into uracils, while methylated cytosines are preserved. PCR amplification is then carried out with primers designed to amplify both methylated and unmethylated templates. After this amplification, highly methylated DNA sequences contain a higher number of CpG sites compared to unmethylated templates, which results in a different melting temperature that can be used in quantitative methylation detection.
- Ancient DNA methylation reconstruction, a method to reconstruct high-resolution DNA methylation from ancient DNA samples. The method is based on the natural degradation processes that occur in ancient DNA: with time, methylated cytosines are degraded into thymines, whereas unmethylated cytosines are degraded into uracils. This asymmetry in degradation signals was used to reconstruct the full methylation maps of the Neanderthal and the Denisovan. In September 2019, researchers published a novel method to infer morphological traits from DNA methylation data. The authors were able to show that linking down-regulated genes to phenotypes of monogenic diseases, where one or two copies of a gene are perturbed, allows for ~85% accuracy in reconstructing anatomical traits directly from DNA methylation maps.
- Methylation Sensitive Single Nucleotide Primer Extension Assay (msSNuPE), which uses internal primers annealing straight 5' of the nucleotide to be detected.
- Illumina Methylation Assay measures locus-specific DNA methylation using array hybridization. Bisulfite-treated DNA is hybridized to probes on "BeadChips." Single-base base extension with labeled probes is used to determine methylation status of target sites. In 2016, the Infinium MethylationEPIC BeadChip was released, which interrogates over 850,000 methylation sites across the human genome.
- PacBio SMRT sequencing offers methylation detection as part of PCR-free DNA sequencing
- Oxford Nanopore Technologies DNA Sequencing can also be done with simultaneous Methylation calling if the DNA was not amplified by PCR prior to sequencing

== Differentially methylated regions ==
Differentially methylated regions (DMRs), which are genomic regions with different methylation statuses among multiple samples (tissues, cells, individuals or others), are regarded as possible functional regions involved in gene transcriptional regulation. The identification of DMRs among multiple tissues (T-DMRs) provides a comprehensive survey of epigenetic differences among human tissues. For example, these methylated regions that are unique to a particular tissue allow individuals to differentiate between tissue type, such as semen and vaginal fluid. Current research conducted by Lee et al., showed DACT1 and USP49 positively identified semen by examining T-DMRs. The use of T-DMRs has proven useful in the identification of various body fluids found at crime scenes. Researchers in the forensic field are currently seeking novel T-DMRs in genes to use as markers in forensic DNA analysis. DMRs between cancer and normal samples (C-DMRs) demonstrate the aberrant methylation in cancers. It is well known that DNA methylation is associated with cell differentiation and proliferation. Multiple DMRs have been found in the development stages (D-DMRs) and in the reprogrammed progress (R-DMRs). In addition, there are intra-individual DMRs (Intra-DMRs) with longitudinal changes in global DNA methylation along with the increase of age in a given individual. There are also inter-individual DMRs (Inter-DMRs) with different methylation patterns among multiple individuals.

QDMR (Quantitative Differentially Methylated Regions) is a quantitative approach to quantify methylation difference and identify DMRs from genome-wide methylation profiles by adapting Shannon entropy. The platform-free and species-free nature of QDMR makes it potentially applicable to various methylation data. This approach provides an effective tool for the high-throughput identification of the functional regions involved in epigenetic regulation. QDMR can be used as an effective tool for the quantification of methylation difference and identification of DMRs across multiple samples.

Gene-set analysis (a.k.a. pathway analysis; usually performed tools such as DAVID, GoSeq or GSEA) has been shown to be severely biased when applied to high-throughput methylation data (e.g. MeDIP-seq, MeDIP-ChIP, HELP-seq etc.), and a wide range of studies have thus mistakenly reported hyper-methylation of genes related to development and differentiation; it has been suggested that this can be corrected using sample label permutations or using a statistical model to control for differences in the numbers of CpG probes / CpG sites that target each gene.

== DNA methylation marks ==
DNA methylation marks – genomic regions with specific methylation patterns in a specific biological state such as tissue, cell type, individual – are regarded as possible functional regions involved in gene transcriptional regulation. Although various human cell types may have the same genome, these cells have different methylomes. The systematic identification and characterization of methylation marks across cell types are crucial to understanding the complex regulatory network for cell fate determination. Hongbo Liu et al. proposed an entropy-based framework termed SMART to integrate the whole genome bisulfite sequencing methylomes across 42 human tissues/cells and identified 757,887 genome segments. Nearly 75% of the segments showed uniform methylation across all cell types. From the remaining 25% of the segments, they identified cell type-specific hypo/hypermethylation marks that were specifically hypo/hypermethylated in a minority of cell types using a statistical approach and presented an atlas of the human methylation marks. Further analysis revealed that the cell type-specific hypomethylation marks were enriched through H3K27ac and transcription factor binding sites in a cell type-specific manner. In particular, they observed that the cell type-specific hypomethylation marks are associated with the cell type-specific super-enhancers that drive the expression of cell identity genes. This framework provides a complementary, functional annotation of the human genome and helps to elucidate the critical features and functions of cell type-specific hypomethylation.

The entropy-based Specific Methylation Analysis and Report Tool, termed "SMART", which focuses on integrating a large number of DNA methylomes for the de novo identification of cell type-specific methylation marks. The latest version of SMART is focused on three main functions including de novo identification of differentially methylated regions (DMRs) by genome segmentation, identification of DMRs from predefined regions of interest, and identification of differentially methylated CpG sites.

=== In identification and detection of body fluids ===
DNA methylation allows for several tissues to be analyzed in one assay as well as for small amounts of body fluid to be identified with the use of extracted DNA. Usually, the two approaches of DNA methylation are either methylated-sensitive restriction enzymes or treatment with sodium bisulphite. Methylated sensitive restriction enzymes work by cleaving specific CpG, cytosine and guanine separated by only one phosphate group, recognition sites when the CpG is methylated. In contrast, unmethylated cytosines are transformed to uracil and in the process, methylated cytosines remain methylated. In particular, methylation profiles can provide insight on when or how body fluids were left at crime scenes, identify the kind of body fluid, and approximate age, gender, and phenotypic characteristics of perpetrators. Research indicates various markers that can be used for DNA methylation. Deciding which marker to use for an assay is one of the first steps of the identification of body fluids. In general, markers are selected by examining prior research conducted. Identification markers that are chosen should give a positive result for one type of cell. One portion of the chromosome that is an area of focus when conducting DNA methylation are tissue-specific differentially methylated regions, T-DMRs. The degree of methylation for the T-DMRs ranges depending on the body fluid. A research team developed a marker system that is two-fold. The first marker is methylated only in the target fluid while the second is methylated in the rest of the fluids. For instance, if venous blood marker A is un-methylated and venous blood marker B is methylated in a fluid, it indicates the presence of only venous blood. In contrast, if venous blood marker A is methylated and venous blood marker B is un-methylated in some fluid, then that indicates venous blood is in a mixture of fluids. Some examples for DNA methylation markers are Mens1(menstrual blood), Spei1(saliva), and Sperm2(seminal fluid).

DNA methylation provides a relatively good means of sensitivity when identifying and detecting body fluids. In one study, only ten nanograms of a sample was necessary to ascertain successful results. DNA methylation provides a good discernment of mixed samples since it involves markers that give "on or off" signals. DNA methylation is not impervious to external conditions. Even under degraded conditions using the DNA methylation techniques, the markers are stable enough that there are still noticeable differences between degraded samples and control samples. Specifically, in one study, it was found that there were not any noticeable changes in methylation patterns over an extensive period of time.

The detection of DNA methylation in cell-free DNA and other body fluids has recently become one of the main approaches to Liquid biopsy. In particular, the identification of tissue-specific and disease-specific patterns allows for non-invasive detection and monitoring of diseases such as cancer. If compared to strictly genomic approaches to liquid biopsy, DNA methylation profiling offers a larger number of differentially methylated CpG sites and differentially methylated regions (DMRSs), potentially enhancing its sensitivity. Signal deconvolution algorithms based on DNA methylation have been successfully applied to cell-free DNA and can nominate the tissue of origin of cancers of unknown primary, allograft rejection, and resistance to hormone therapy.

== Computational prediction ==
DNA methylation can also be detected by computational models through sophisticated algorithms and methods. Computational models can facilitate the global profiling of DNA methylation across chromosomes, and often such models are faster and cheaper to perform than biological assays. Such up-to-date computational models include Bhasin, et al., Bock, et al., and Zheng, et al. Together with biological assay, these methods greatly facilitate the DNA methylation analysis.

== See also ==
- 5-Hydroxymethylcytosine
- 5-Methylcytosine
- 7-Methylguanosine
- Decrease in DNA Methylation I (DDM1), a plant methylation gene
- Demethylating agent
- Differentially methylated regions
- DNA demethylation
- DNA methylation reprogramming
- Epigenetics, of which DNA methylation is a significant contributor
- Epigenetic clock, a method to calculate age based on DNA methylation
- Epigenome
- Genome
- Genomic imprinting, an inherited repression of an allele, relying on DNA methylation
- MethBase DNA Methylation database hosted on the UCSC Genome Browser
- MethDB DNA Methylation database
- N^{6}-Methyladenosine
- Protein methylation
- Methylenetetrahydrofolate reductase deficiency
