= Vac7 =

Vacuolar segregation protein 7

Identifiers
- Organism: S. cerevisiae S288c
- Symbol: VAC7
- Entrez: 855673
- RefSeq (mRNA): NM_001182893
- RefSeq (Prot): NP_014344
- UniProt: P53950

Other data
- Chromosome: XIV: 0.53 - 0.53 Mb
Search for
- Structures: Swiss-model
- Domains: InterPro

Vacuolar segregation protein 7 is a protein that in yeast is encoded by the VAC7 gene. VAC7 is a component of the PI(3,5)P2 regulatory complex, composed of ATG18, FIG4, FAB1, VAC14 and VAC7.

== Function ==
The PI(3,5)P2 regulatory complex regulates both the synthesis and turnover of phosphatidylinositol 3,5-bisphosphate (PtdIns(3,5)P2). VAC7 activates FAB1 kinase for example during hyperosmotic shock and can elevate levels of PtdIns(3,5)P2 in the absence of VAC14 and FIG4. VAC7 is directly involved in vacuolar membrane scission and is required for normal vacuole acidification, inheritance and morphology.
