= Phosphatidylinositol 5-phosphate =

Phosphatidylinositol 5-phosphate (PtdIns5P) is a phosphoinositide, one of the phosphorylated derivatives of phosphatidylinositol (PtdIns), that are well-established membrane-anchored regulatory molecules. Phosphoinositides participate in signaling events that control cytoskeletal dynamics, intracellular membrane trafficking, cell proliferation and many other cellular functions. Generally, phosphoinositides transduce signals by recruiting specific phosphoinositide-binding proteins to intracellular membranes.

Phosphatidylinositol 5-phosphate is one of the 7 known cellular phosphoinositides with less understood functions. It is phosphorylated on position D-5 of the inositol head group, which is attached via phosphodiester linkage to diacylglycerol (with varying chemical composition of the acyl chains, frequently 1-stearoyl-2-arachidonoyl chain). In quiescent cells, on average, PtdIns5P is of similar or higher abundance as compared to PtdIns3P and ~20-100-fold below the levels of PtdIns4P (Phosphatidylinositol 4-phosphate and PtdIns(4,5)P2 (Phosphatidylinositol 4,5-bisphosphate). Notably, steady-state PtdIns5P levels are more than 5-fold higher than those of PtdIns(3,5)P2.

PtdIns5P was first demonstrated by HPLC (high pressure liquid chromatography) in mouse fibroblasts as a substrate for PtdIns(4,5)P2 synthesis by type II PIP kinases (1-phosphatidylinositol-5-phosphate 4-kinase). In many cell types, however, PtdIns5P is not detected by HPLC due to technical limitations associated with its poor separation from the abundant PtdIns4P. Rather, PtdIns5P is measured by the "mass assay", where PtdIns5P (as a part of the extracted cellular lipids) is converted in vitro by purified PtdIns5P 4-kinase to PtdIns(4,5)P2 that is subsequently quantified.

Based on studies with the mass assay and an improved HPLC technique, PtdIns5P is detected in all studied mammalian cells. Most of the cellular PtdIns5P is found on cytoplasmic membranes whereas a smaller fraction resides in the nucleus. The cytoplasmic and nuclear pools have distinct functions and regulation.

== Metabolism ==
Cellular PtdIns5P could be produced by D-5-phosphorylation of phosphatidylinositol or by dephosphorylation of PtdIns(3,5)P2 or PtdIns(4,5)P2. Each of these possibilities is experimentally supported. PtdIns5P is synthesized in vitro by PIKfyve, an enzyme principally responsible for PtdIns(3,5)P2 production, as well as by [PIP5K]s. A major role for PIKfyve in synthesis of cellular PtdIns5P is suggested by data for reduced PtdIns5P mass levels upon heterologous overexpression of the enzymatically inactive PIKfyve point-mutant (PIKfyveK1831E) and PIKfyve silencing by small interfering RNAs. Such a role is reinforced by data in transgenic fibroblasts with one genetically disrupted PIKfyve allele, demonstrating equal reduction of steady-state levels of PtdIns5P and PtdIns(3,5)P2.

Likewise, similar reduction of PtdIns5P and PtdIns(3,5)P2 is found in fibroblasts with knockout of the PIKfyve activator ArPIKfyve/VAC14. This experimental evidence coupled with the fact that the cellular levels of PtdIns5P exceed more than 5-fold those of PtdIns(3,5)P2 indicate a predominant role of PIKfyve in maintenance of the steady-state PtdIns5P levels via D-5 phosphorylation of phosphatidylinositol.

A role for the myotubularin protein family in PtdIns5P production has been proposed based on dephosphorylation of PtdIns(3,5)P2 by overexpressed myotubularin 1. Concordantly, genetic ablation of the myotubularin-related protein 2 (MTMR2) causes elevation of cellular PtdIns(3,5)P2 and a decrease of PtdIns5P. The low cellular levels of PtdIns(3,5)P2 suggest that myotubularin phosphatase activity plays a minor role in maintaining the steady-state PtdIns5P levels. Importantly, PtdIns(3,5)P2 is synthesized from PtdIns3P by the PIKfyve complex that includes ArPIKfyve and Sac3/Fig4. Noteworthy, the PIKfyve complex underlies both PtdIns(3,5)P2 synthesis from and turnover to PtdIns3P. The relative proportion of PtdIns(3,5)P2 turnover by myotubularin phosphatases versus that by Sac3 is unknown.

PtdIns5P can also be produced by dephosphorylation of PtdIns(4,5)P2. Such phosphatase activity is shown for Shigella flexneri effector IpgD and two mammalian phosphatases – PtdIns(4,5)P2 4-phosphatase type I and type II.

In myoblast, PtdIns5P is rapidly metabolized by the PI5P 4-kinase α into PI(4,5)P2 which accumulates at the plasma membrane thereby facilitating the formation of podosome-like protrusions, playing a crucial role in the spatiotemporal regulation of myoblast fusion.

Currently, there is no known mammalian phosphatase to specifically dephosphorylate PtdIns5P. The pathway for PtdIns5P clearance involves synthesis of PtdIns(4,5)P2.

== Functions ==
The levels of PtdIns5P change significantly in response to physiological and pathological stimuli. Insulin, thrombin, T-cell activation, and cell transformation with nucleophosmin anaplastic lymphoma tyrosine kinase (NPM-ALK), cause elevation of cellular PtdIns5P levels. In contrast, hypoosmotic shock and histamine treatment decrease the levels of PtdIns5P. In T-cells, two "downstream of tyrosine kinase" proteins DOK1 and DOK2 are proposed as PtdIns5P-binding proteins and effectors.

As the other phosphoinositides, PtdIns5P is also present in the nucleus of mammalian cells. The nuclear PtdIns5P pool is controlled by the nuclear type I PtdIns(4,5)P2 4-phosphatase that, in conjunction with the PIPKIIbeta kinase, plays a role in UV stress, apoptosis and cell cycle progression.

The function of PtdIns5P in nuclear signaling likely involves ING2, a member of the ING family. The proteins of this family associate with and modulate the activity of histone acetylases and deacetylases as well as induce apoptosis through p53 acetylation. The ING2 interacts with PtdIns5P via its plant homeodomain (PHD) finger motif.

In summary, the available evidence indicates that PIKfyve activity is the major source of steady-state cellular PtdIns5P. Under certain conditions, PtdIns5P is produced by dephosphorylation of bis-phosphoinositides. PtdIns5P is involved in regulation of both basic cellular functions and responses to a multitude of physiological and pathological stimuli by yet- to- be specified molecular mechanisms.
