= Yunis–Varon syndrome =

- Other names: Cleidocranial dysplasia with micrognathia, absent thumbs and distal aphalangia
- Yunis–Varon syndrome has an autosomal recessive pattern of inheritance.
- Specialty: Medical genetics

Yunis–Varon syndrome (YVS), also called cleidocranial dysplasia with micrognathia or absent thumbs and distal aphalangia, is an extremely rare autosomal recessive multisystem congenital disorder which affects the skeletal system, ectodermal tissue, heart and respiratory system. It was first described by Emilio Yunis and Humberto Váron from the National University of Colombia.

== Genetics ==
This syndrome is inherited in an autosomal recessive manner. Several mutations in the FIG4-encoding gene were found to cause Yunis–Varon syndrome. Some of these mutations result in complete loss of protein function; others involve amino-acid replacements at highly conserved residues. Not all mutations in the FIG4 gene result Yunis–Varon syndrome. Some mutations lead to various forms of Charcot–Marie–Tooth disease, Amyotrophic lateral sclerosis 11, and bilateral temporooccipital polymicrogyria.

Patients affected with Yunis–Varon syndrome are homozygous, compound homozygous, or compound heterozygous for deleterious mutations in FIG4.

=== Animal model ===
Spongiform degeneration of mouse brains caused by altering PI3P to PI(3,5)P2 conversion is associated with human Charcot-Marie-Tooth disease and amyotrophic lateral sclerosis (ALS) by accumulation of Lc3II, p62, and LAMP2 proteins, which also contributes to inclusion body disease. Manipulation of this signaling lipid involves culturing fibroblasts obtained by insertion of ETn2-beta(early transposon 2-beta) into intron 18 of FIG4 gene in vacuolar membrane of mice labeled pale tremor (plt). These fibroblasts fill with immunoreactive large vacuoles; but more importantly their abnormal concentration of PI(3,5)P2 demonstrates conserved function of mammalian FIG4 and late endosome-lysosome axis failure responsible for lack of apoptosis of neurons and Schwann cells (but large motor axons are still lost while demyelination still happens). In contrast, homozygous FIG4 defective (FIG4-/-) mice have a reduction of myelin, especially in optic nerves; but this detriment is rescued by an overexpression of human FIG4 I41T at low-level function. While FIG4-null adult mice have macroscopically normal brains with increments in apoptosis and neuronal density with delayed cell maturation, neonatal mice maintain all neurologic defects. FIG4 expression in mouse brain cells is also comparable to that of calvaria, osteoblasts, and bone marrow cells.

== Pathophysiology ==
The mechanism of mutation in FIG4 causing Yunis–Varon syndrome involves altering conversion of phosphatidylinositol 3-phosphate (PI3P) to signaling lipid phosphatidylinositol 3,5-bisphosphate(PI(3,5)P2). Because this conversion in endosomal membranes changes dynamically with fission and fusion events to create/absorb intracellular transport vesicles, enlarged cytoplasmic vacuoles have been found in patient neurons, muscle, and cartilage. These have been identified as intracytoplasmic vacuoles(fluid sacs inside cellular cytoplasm) causing excessive build-up of vacuolated macrophages in bone marrow and pericardial fluid in the heart. Fluids may also accumulate in a choroid spaces under the retina, causing central serous retinopathy or chorioretinopathy and possibly vision loss. Paradoxically, overexpression of FIG4 does not yield obvious morphologic phenotype of these fluids accumulating, but alters PI(3,5)P2 levels making cells prone to expansion through dilation of intracellular membranes. Under expression, on the other hand, enhances endosome carrier and formation of vesicles/multivesicular bodies. Central nervous system dysfunction and extensive skeletal anomalies suggest a role for Phosphatidylinositol 3,5-bisphosphate, or PI(3,5)P2, signaling in skeletal development and maintenance.

== Diagnosis ==
Features of Yunis–Varon syndrome include growth retardation before and after birth, defective growth of the bones of the skull along with complete or partial absence of the shoulder blades and characteristic facial features. Additional symptoms may include abnormalities of the fingers and/or toes including missing nails/fingers. In most cases, infants with this disorder experience severe feeding problems and respiratory difficulties. In addition, affected infants may have heart defects. Osteodysplasties or bone abnormalities may be severe enough to become fatal in as little as 10 weeks of age, making lethality extremely common during infancy.

=== Skeletal ===
Defects include cleidocranial dysplasia as abnormal bone development through hypoplastic (absent) clavicles, induced macrocrania (abnormal increase of skull), and diastasis (separation) of sutures. Yunis–Varon syndrome also causes digital anomalies as most patients show aplasia (absence) of thumbs as well as distal phalanges or hypoplasia (underdevelopment) of proximal phalanx with absence and/or agenesis of halluces' (big toes') distal phalanxes sometimes with absent. Pelvic dysplasia may also be present, causing hips to be retracted and delineated through bilateral dislocation. These deformities in addition to microcephaly and reduced ossification from the disease might be partially due to the affected individual's under-mineralized skeleton.

=== Neurologic ===
Intraneural inclusions (bodies within neural cells) with vacuolar degeneration are prominent mostly in the patient's thalamic nuclei, dentante nuclei, cerebellar cortex, and inferior olivary nuclei. Hypoplasia of frontal lobes, corpus callosum, cerebellar vermis connecting the two brain hemispheres along with polymicrogyria causing excessive folding leading to an abnormally thick cortex are also phenotypes of this disorder.

=== Facial ===
Obvious signs of Yunis–Varon syndrome include soft and large fontanelles, high forehead, prominent eyes, large ears with hypoplastic lobes, low nasal bridge, anteverted nostrils, short philtrum above the lip, high-arched palate at the roof of the mouth, micrognathia or small jaw, and sparse hair (Hypotrichosis) with absent eyebrows and eyelashes.

== Treatment ==
Early intervention is considered important. For infants, breathing and feeding difficulties, are monitored. Therapies used are "symptomatic and supportive."

== Epidemiology ==
Yunis–Varon syndrome has been described relatively recently in the 1980s and since then less than 15 cases have been reported around the world. Many of the infants did not survive beyond one year of age.
