= SacI homology domain =

Family of evolutionarily related proteins

Identifiers
- Symbol: Syja_N
- Pfam: PF02383
- InterPro: IPR002013
- PROSITE: PS50275
Available protein structures:
- PDB: IPR002013 PF02383 (ECOD; PDBsum)
- AlphaFold: IPR002013; PF02383

SacI homology domain is most notably found at the amino terminal of the inositol 5'-phosphatase synaptojanin. Synaptic vesicles are recycled with remarkable speed and precision in nerve terminals. A major recycling pathway involves clathrin-mediated endocytosis at endocytic zones located around sites of release. Different 'accessory' proteins linked to this pathway have been shown to alter the shape and composition of lipid membranes, to modify membrane-coat protein interactions, and to influence actin polymerization. These include the GTPase dynamin, the lysophosphatidic acid acyl transferase endophilin, and the phosphoinositide phosphatase synaptojanin.

The recessive suppressor of secretory defect in yeast Golgi and yeast actin function belongs to this family. This protein may be involved in the coordination of the activities of the secretory pathway and the actin cytoskeleton.

The SacI homology domain shows homology to the yeast protein SacI P32368.

Human synaptojanin which may be localised on coated endocytic intermediates in nerve terminals also belongs to this family.

== Examples ==
Human genes encoding proteins containing this domain include:

FIG4; INPP5F; SACM1L; SYNJ1; SYNJ2;
