= C47H80O19P3 =

The molecular formula C_{47}H_{80}O_{19}P_{3} may refer to:

- Phosphatidylinositol 3,4-bisphosphate
- Phosphatidylinositol 3,5-bisphosphate
- Phosphatidylinositol 4,5-bisphosphate
