= Robert B. Mellor =

British scientist

- Born: Yorkshire, UK
- Citizenship: GB
- Education: Newcastle University
- Known for: Contributions to biological, environmental and economic sciences
- Awards: Several
- Scientific career
- Fields: Natural Sciences and Computing
- Workplaces: Kingston University, IT University of Copenhagen, University of Göttingen , University of Basel; Marburg University
- Thesis: The nodulation of legumes (DSc) (1997)
- Website: www.kingston.ac.uk/about/staff/dr-robert-b-mellor/

Robert B. Mellor (born in Yorkshire, UK) is a British scientist probably best known for his 1989 "unified vacuole theory", although he also made significant contributions to environmental technology and to our understanding of the workings of the tech entrepreneurship ecosystem.

== Unified vacuole theory ==
Mellor's theory states that in plant endosymbioses, the micro-symbiont and the macro-symbiont generally share their lytic vacuolar compartments. This stems from Mellor's earlier 1988 symbiosome (or "symbiosome is a lysosome") theory, which states that the organelle that microsymbionts inhabit partially takes over the lysosomal functions in these plant cells, becoming analogous to protein bodies in seeds, in particular that the rhizobial symbiosome is an organ-specific form of lysosome or vacuole in legume root nodules.

== The Marburg and Basel Years (plant biology) ==
Mellor was interested in how plants distinguish between symbiotic and pathogenic infections. In 1984, he set about measuring defence responses including Phytoalexin and Chitinase in nodules infected with different rhizobial mutants. Gradually, he observed that in Rhizobia, the nod genes are responsible for producing different nod factors (lipo-chitin molecules) and that, among many other effects, he also observed that these molecules can provoke plant defence responses, so that it is essential that these genes be switched off after infection, or symbiosis could not take place. This model won general acclaim, and the paper with David Collinge was later reprinted (Mellor and Collinge, 1995) as that year's number one most important publication in the area of Plant Sciences.

In other works, Mellor has claimed that in legumes the root nodule cytoplasm may be under water stress and the plant may combat this by using the bacterial/fungal (in the case of vesicular arbuscular mycorrhiza) disaccharide sugar trehalose. The concept has been repeatedly confirmed, and this effect explains why nodulated plants have a higher drought tolerance than non-nodulated plants.

== The Göttingen Years (environmental nanotech) ==
Mellor was also interested in applied science, and after leaving the University of Basel he became director of research and development at a German chemical company. There he led the group that invented and patented a system to power immobilized oxido-reductase enzymes and artificial co-factors using electrical power from a domestic socket. Twenty-five years later, the authors Eltarahony et al. stated in their round-up review paper that "... Mellor et al. [1992] pioneered the concept of current promotion, electrode bioreactor and denitrification control, this concept, [is now] widely used to treat different types of wastewater, such as toxic and refractory organic wastewater as well as wastewater containing heavy metal ions" helping to provide clean water for millions of people globally.

== The London Years (computing and maths) ==
In early 2000, Mellor joined and helped start-up IT the University of Copenhagen, alongside Mads Tofte and others. In 2005 he became Director of Enterprise at Kingston University, London, (and quadrupling enterprise income) in Computing, Information Systems and Mathematics while teaching the mathematical modelling of business processes and knowledge management at MSc level. Mellor, influenced by Stiglitz, realized that econometric methods can be used to quantify the value of knowledge management. His breakthrough computer modelling resulted in a complete explanation of the developmental lifecycle of SMEs (small and medium-sized enterprises), firstly in his 2011 book and then later expanded upon in his 2018 publication, "Big Data Modelling the Knowledge Economy".

He runs a Masters programme around IT Consultancy, as well as a select "Big Data" research group engaged with modelling organizations, especially Science Parks, in the context of regional development.

Most recently, working together with Matthias Georg Will, an econometric computer model was developed which explains why, in modern business environments, flat organizations can only exist if employees are able to competently evaluate incoming innovations and their judgement is accepted by their managers, a situation typified by the successful tech firms.

== Personal life ==
Keen on outdoor activities, R. B. Mellor has cycled across most of Europe; in the 1970's with his friend John Jowett he traversed Scotland on foot and also in 1980 co-wrote "The Pennine Way Pub Guide" (with John Jowett and Paul Wilson). He has climbed most of the central Pyrenees and in the 80's and 90's was occasional guide ('bergführer') for the Alpine Association (Alpenverein) in the Dolomites and Austrian Eastern Alps. Always interested in music, he added support to the Danish Soca music band Tropicats on their 1995 CD "Lets go Bananas". He holds an enhanced certificate for working with children and the vulnerable, and can often be found holding careers talks etc. in local schools and colleges.

== Works ==
Mellor is the author of over 125 scientific publications in journals, including eleven books, several of which have been translated into other languages. His impact factor (h-Index) is ~30, putting him into the top percentile (1%) of all researchers worldwide and in the top 20 researchers in computer modelling. He is an active consultant with over twelve years of industrial experience, and he lectures at postgraduate level on subjects like 'information systems and econometrics', 'mathematical knowledge management', 'strategic innovation', and 'tech entrepreneurship'. He has received many international prizes for his work and ideas, and in 2020, he became a member of the advisor pool to the UK Government Office for Science on post-COVID-19 needs.

=== Articles ===
- Mellor, Robert B.; Ronnenberg, Jörg; Campbell, Wilbur H.; Diekmann, Stephen (February 1992). "Reduction of nitrate and nitrite in water by immobilized enzymes". Nature. 355 (6362): 717–719. Bibcode:1992Natur.355..717M. doi:10.1038/355717a0. S2CID 4357605.
- Mellor, Robert B (1989). "Bacteroids in the Rhizobium-Legume Symbiosis Inhabit a Plant Internal Lytic Compartment: Implications for other Microbial Endosymbioses". Journal of Experimental Botany. 40 (8): 831–839. doi:10.1093/jxb/40.8.831.
- Mellor, R. B. (January 1992). "Is trehalose a symbiotic determinant in symbioses between higher plants and microorganisms?". Symbiosis. 12: 113–129.
- Farías-Rodríguez, Rodolfo; Mellor, Robert B.; Arias, Carlos; Peña-Cabriales, Juan José (March 1998). "The accumulation of trehalose in nodules of several cultivars of common bean (Phaseolus vulgaris) and its correlation with resistance to drought stress". Physiologia Plantarum. 102 (3): 353–359. Bibcode:1998PPlan.102..353F. doi:10.1034/j.1399-3054.1998.1020303.x.
- Werner, Dietrich; Mellor, Robert B.; Hahn, Michael G.; Grisebach, Hans (1 April 1985). "Soybean Root Response to Symbiotic Infection Glyceollin I Accumulation in an Ineffective Type of Soybean Nodules with an Early Loss of the Peribacteroid Membrane". Zeitschrift für Naturforschung C. 40 (3–4): 179–181. doi:10.1515/znc-1985-3-407. S2CID 37922327.
- Mellor, Robert B.; Collinge, David B. (1995). "A simple model based on known plant defence reactions is sufficient to explain most aspects of nodulation" (PDF). Journal of Experimental Botany. 46 (1): 1–18. doi:10.1093/jxb/46.1.1-a.
- Mellor, Robert B. (2018). "Big data modelling the knowledge economy" (PDF). International Journal of Knowledge-Based Development. 9 (3): 206. doi:10.1504/IJKBD.2018.094896. SSRN 3368891.
- Will, Matthias G.; Al-Kfairy, Mousa; Mellor, Robert B. (July 2019). "How organizational structure transforms risky innovations into performance – A computer simulation" (PDF). Simulation Modelling Practice and Theory. 94: 264–285. doi:10.1016/j.simpat.2019.03.007. S2CID 108313964.

=== Books ===
- 1996: The Nodulation of Legumes. DSR forlag. OCLC 1124029713.
- 2001: ASP: Learning by Example. Franklin Beedle. ISBN 1-887902-68-6.
- 2002: DHTML: Learning by Example. Franklin Beedle. ISBN 1-887902-83-X.
- 2003: XML: Learning by Example. Franklin Beedle. ISBN 1-887902-80-5.
- 2008: Entrepreneurship for Everyone. Sage. ISBN 978-1-4129-4776-3.
- 2011: Knowledge Management and Information Systems. Palgrave Macmillan. ISBN 978-0-230-28043-4.
- 2019: Management for Scientists. Emerald Publishing Limited, ISBN 978-1-787-69204-6
