= PIKFYVE =

Protein-coding gene in humans

Identifiers
- Aliases: PIKFYVE, CFD, FAB1, HEL37, PIP5K, PIP5K3, ZFYVE29, phosphoinositide kinase, FYVE-type zinc finger containing
- External IDs: OMIM: 609414; MGI: 1335106; GeneCards: PIKFYVE
Enzyme activity
EC #	BRENDA	ExPASy	KEGG	MetaCyc
2.7.1.150	↗	↗	↗	↗
2.7.11.1	↗	↗	↗	↗

Gene location (Human)
Chr.	Chromosome 2 (human)
Band	2q34	Start	208,266,255 bp
Band	2q34	End	208,358,746 bp

Gene location (Mouse)
Chr.	Chromosome 1 (mouse)
Band	1|1 C3	Start	65,225,842 bp
Band	1|1 C3	End	65,317,854 bp
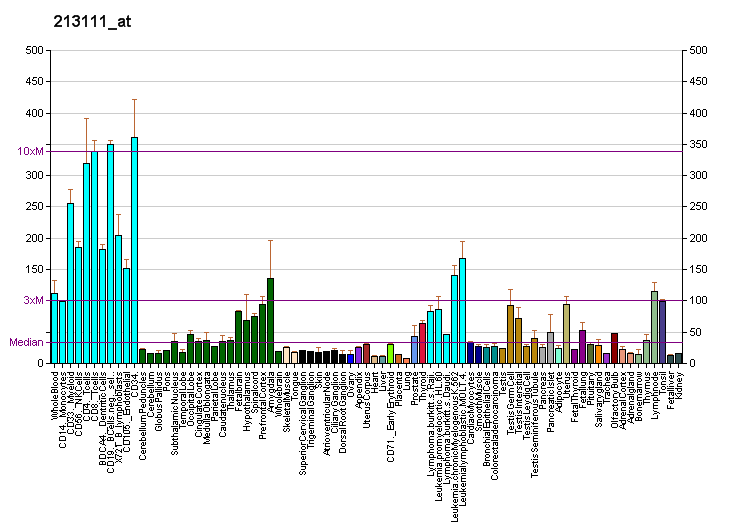

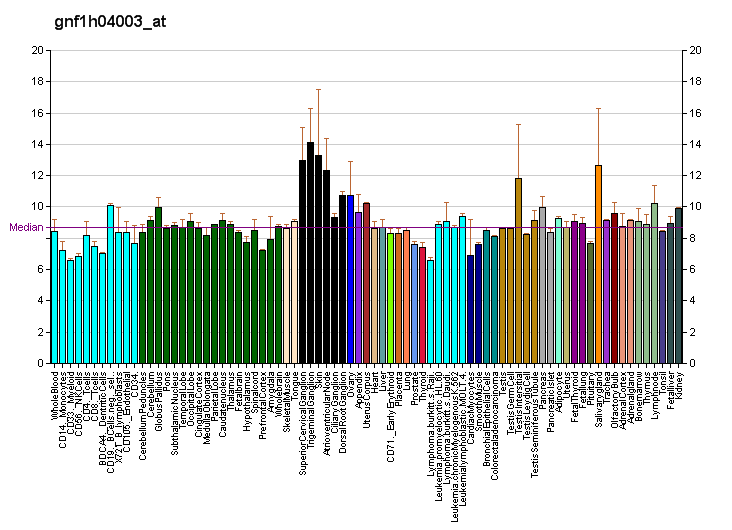
RNA expression pattern
Bgee	Human / Mouse (ortholog); Top expressed in: secondary oocyte; Epithelium of choroid plexus; seminal vesicula; corpus epididymis; cartilage tissue; tibia; Achilles tendon; tail of epididymis; jejunal mucosa; bone marrow / Top expressed in: Rostral migratory stream; ciliary body; stroma of bone marrow; retinal pigment epithelium; iris; Epithelium of choroid plexus; cumulus cell; granulocyte; granular layer; pineal gland; More reference expression data
BioGPS	More reference expression data
Gene ontology
Molecular function	transferase activity; nucleotide binding; zinc ion binding; 1-phosphatidylinositol-4-phosphate 5-kinase activity; metal ion binding; kinase activity; protein binding; phosphatidylinositol phosphate kinase activity; ATP binding; phosphatidylinositol-3,5-bisphosphate 5-phosphatase activity; 1-phosphatidylinositol-3-phosphate 5-kinase activity; protein folding chaperone activity; unfolded protein binding
Cellular component	cytosol; endosome; early endosome membrane; membrane; late endosome membrane; cell-cell junction; vesicle membrane; Golgi membrane; perinuclear region of cytoplasm; membrane raft; endosome membrane; cytoplasmic vesicle
Biological process	intracellular signal transduction; phosphatidylinositol metabolic process; phosphorylation; myelin assembly; receptor-mediated endocytosis; regulation of autophagosome assembly; phosphatidylinositol phosphate biosynthetic process; retrograde transport, endosome to Golgi; phosphatidylinositol 5-phosphate metabolic process; protein localization to nucleus; phosphatidylinositol biosynthetic process; phosphatidylinositol-3-phosphate biosynthetic process; 'de novo' protein folding; chaperone-mediated protein folding; protein folding
Sources:Amigo / QuickGO
Orthologs
Databases	NCBI: entry; OMA: entry
Species	Human	Mouse
Entrez	200576	18711
Ensembl	ENSG00000115020	ENSMUSG00000025949
UniProt	Q9Y2I7	Q9Z1T6
RefSeq (mRNA)	NM_001002881; NM_001178000; NM_015040; NM_152671	NM_011086; NM_001310624
RefSeq (protein)	NP_001171471; NP_055855; NP_689884	NP_001297553; NP_035216
Location (UCSC)	Chr 2: 208.27 – 208.36 Mb	Chr 1: 65.23 – 65.32 Mb
PubMed search
- Wikidata
View/Edit Human	View/Edit Mouse

PIKfyve, a FYVE finger-containing phosphoinositide kinase, is an enzyme that in humans is encoded by the PIKFYVE gene.

== Evolution ==
PIKFYVE belongs to a large family of evolutionarily-conserved lipid kinases. Single copy genes, encoding similarly-structured FYVE-domain–containing phosphoinositide kinases exist in most genomes from yeast to man. The plant A. thaliana has several copies of the enzyme. Higher eukaryotes (after D. melanogaster), acquire an additional DEP domain. The S. cerevisiae enzyme Fab1p is required for PtdIns(3,5)P2 synthesis under basal conditions and in response to hyperosmotic shock. PtdIns5P, made by PIKfyve kinase activity in mammalian cells, is not detected in budding yeast. Yeast Fab1p associates with Vac14p (the ortholog of human ArPIKfyve) and Fig4p (the ortholog of Sac3). The yeast Fab1 complex also includes Vac7p and probably Atg18p, proteins that are not detected in the mammalian PIKfyve complex. S. cerevisiae could survive without Fab1. In contrast, the knockout of the FYVE domain-containing enzymes in A. thaliana, D. melanogaster, C. elegans and M. musculus leads to embryonic lethality indicating that the FYVE-domain–containing phosphoinositide kinases have become essential in embryonic development of multicellular organisms. Thus, in evolution, the FYVE-domain-containing phosphoinositide kinases retain several aspects of the structural organization, enzyme activity and protein interactions from budding yeast. In higher eukaryotes, the enzymes acquire one additional domain, a role in the production of PtdIns5P, a new set of interacting proteins and become essential in embryonic development.

== Function ==
The principal enzymatic activity of PIKfyve is to phosphorylate PtdIns3P to PtdIns(3,5)P2. PIKfyve activity is responsible for the production of both PtdIns(3,5)P2 and phosphatidylinositol 5-phosphate (PtdIns5P). PIKfyve is a large protein, containing a number of functional domains and expressed in several spliced forms. The reported full-length mouse and human cDNA clones encode proteins of 2052 and 2098 amino acid residues, respectively. By directly binding membrane PtdIns(3)P, the FYVE finger domain of PIKfyve is essential in localizing the protein to the cytosolic leaflet of endosomes. Impaired PIKfyve enzymatic activity by dominant-interfering mutants, siRNA- mediated ablation or pharmacological inhibition causes lysosome enlargement and cytoplasmic vacuolation due to impaired PtdIns(3,5)P2 synthesis and impaired lysosome fission process and homeostasis. Thus, via PtdIns(3,5)P2 production, PIKfyve participates in several aspects of vesicular dynamics, thereby affecting a number of trafficking pathways that emanate from or traverse the endosomal system en route to the trans-Golgi network or later compartments along the endocytic pathway.

== Clinical significance ==
PIKfyve mutations affecting one of the two PIKFYVE alleles are found in 8 out of 10 families with Francois-Neetens corneal fleck dystrophy. Disruption of both PIKFYVE alleles in the mouse is lethal at the stage of pre-implantation embryo. PIKfyve’s role in pathogen invasion is deduced by evidence from cell studies implicating PIKfyve activity in HIV and Salmonella replication. A link of PIKfyve with type 2 diabetes is inferred by the observations that PIKfyve perturbation inhibits insulin-regulated glucose uptake. Concordantly, mice with selective Pikfyve gene disruption in skeletal muscle, the tissue mainly responsible for the decrease of postprandial blood sugar, exhibit systemic insulin resistance; glucose intolerance; hyperinsulinemia; and increased adiposity, i.e. symptoms, typical for human prediabetes.

== As a drug target ==
Several small molecule PIKfyve inhibitors have shown promise as cancer therapeutics in preclinical studies due to selective toxicity in non-Hodgkin lymphoma B cells or in U-251 glioblastoma cells. PIKfyve inhibitors cause cell death also in A-375 melanoma cells, which depend on autophagy for growth and proliferation, due to impaired lysosome homeostasis. The potential therapeutic use of PIKfyve inhibitors awaits clinical trials.

== Interactions ==
PIKfyve physically associates with its regulator ArPIKfyve, a protein encoded by the human gene VAC14, and the Sac1 domain-containing PtdIns(3,5)P2 5-phosphatase Sac3, encoded by FIG4, to form a stable ternary heterooligomeric complex that is scaffolded by ArPIKfyve homooligomeric interactions. The presence of two enzymes with opposing activities for PtdIns(3,5)P2 synthesis and turnover in a single complex indicates the requirement for a tight control of PtdIns(3,5)P2 levels. PIKfyve also interacts with the Rab9 effector RABEPK and the kinesin adaptor JLP, encoded by SPAG9. These interactions link PIKfyve to microtubule-based endosome to trans-Golgi network traffic. Under sustained activation of glutamate receptors PIKfyve binds to and facilitates the lysosomal degradation of Ca_{v}1.2, voltage-dependent calcium channel type 1.2, thereby protecting the neurons from excitotoxicity. PIKfyve negatively regulates Ca^{2+}-dependent exocytosis in neuroendocrine cells without affecting voltage-gated calcium channels.
