= ING2 =

Protein-coding gene in the species Homo sapiens

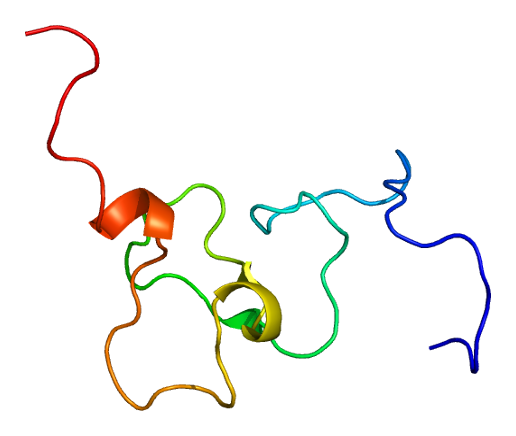

Identifiers
- Aliases: ING2, ING1L, p33inhibitor of growth family member 2
- External IDs: OMIM: 604215; MGI: 1916510; GeneCards: ING2
Available structures
PDB	Ortholog search: PDBe RCSB
PDB	List of PDB id codes 1WES, 2G6Q

Gene location (Human)
Chr.	Chromosome 4 (human)
Band	4q35.1	Start	183,505,058 bp
Band	4q35.1	End	183,512,429 bp

Gene location (Mouse)
Chr.	Chromosome 8 (mouse)
Band	8|8 B1.1	Start	48,120,213 bp
Band	8|8 B1.1	End	48,128,591 bp
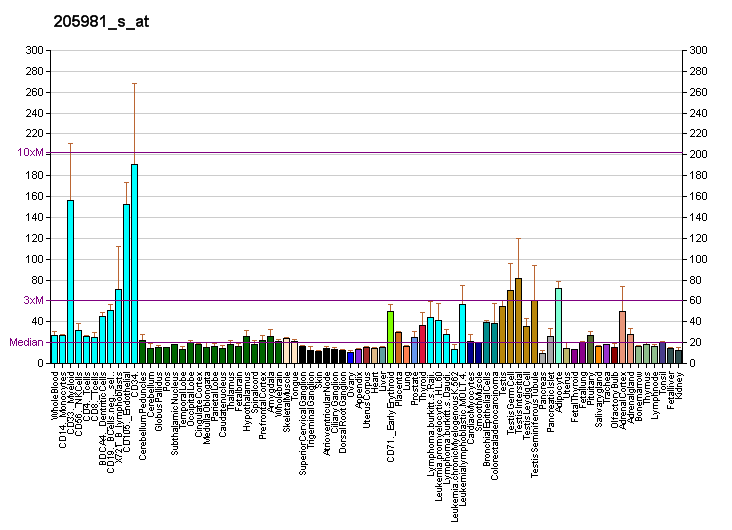
RNA expression pattern
Bgee	Human / Mouse (ortholog); Top expressed in: amniotic fluid; jejunal mucosa; right adrenal gland; right adrenal cortex; buccal mucosa cell; left adrenal gland; left adrenal cortex; gonad; palpebral conjunctiva; bronchial epithelial cell / Top expressed in: lens; epithelium of lens; islet of Langerhans; granulocyte; epiblast; seminiferous tubule; renal corpuscle; neural layer of retina; yolk sac; bone marrow; More reference expression data
BioGPS	More reference expression data
Gene ontology
Molecular function	DNA binding; chromatin binding; metal ion binding; methylated histone binding; protein binding; phosphatidylinositol binding; protein-containing complex binding
Cellular component	Golgi apparatus; plasma membrane; Sin3 complex; CCAAT-binding factor complex; nucleus; nucleoplasm; cytosol
Biological process	flagellated sperm motility; positive regulation of transforming growth factor beta receptor signaling pathway; regulation of transcription, DNA-templated; negative regulation of intrinsic apoptotic signaling pathway in response to DNA damage by p53 class mediator; negative regulation of apoptotic signaling pathway; male meiosis I; transcription, DNA-templated; positive regulation of transcription, DNA-templated; male germ-line stem cell asymmetric division; seminiferous tubule development; spermatogenesis; spermatid development; regulation of growth; regulation of response to DNA damage stimulus; signal transduction; negative regulation of cell population proliferation; chromatin organization; positive regulation of histone deacetylation; regulation of apoptotic process; regulation of cellular senescence
Sources:Amigo / QuickGO
Orthologs
Databases	NCBI: entry; OMA: entry
Species	Human	Mouse
Entrez	3622	69260
Ensembl	ENSG00000168556	ENSMUSG00000063049
UniProt	Q9H160	Q9ESK4
RefSeq (mRNA)	NM_001291959; NM_001564	NM_023503
RefSeq (protein)	NP_001278888; NP_001555	NP_075992
Location (UCSC)	Chr 4: 183.51 – 183.51 Mb	Chr 8: 48.12 – 48.13 Mb
PubMed search
- Wikidata
View/Edit Human	View/Edit Mouse

Inhibitor of growth protein 2 is a protein that in humans is encoded by the ING2 gene.

== Function ==
This gene is a member of the inhibitor of growth (ING) family. Members of the ING family associate with and modulate the activity of histone acetyltransferase (HAT) and histone deacetylase (HDAC) complexes and function in DNA repair and apoptosis.
