= INPP5F =

Protein-coding gene in the species Homo sapiens

Identifiers
- Aliases: INPP5F, MSTPO47, SAC2, hSAC2, MSTP007, inositol polyphosphate-5-phosphatase F
- External IDs: OMIM: 609389; MGI: 2141867; GeneCards: INPP5F
Available structures
PDB	Ortholog search: PDBe RCSB
PDB	List of PDB id codes 4XUU

Gene location (Human)
Chr.	Chromosome 10 (human)
Band	10q26.11	Start	119,726,042 bp
Band	10q26.11	End	119,829,147 bp

Gene location (Mouse)
Chr.	Chromosome 7 (mouse)
Band	7|7 F3	Start	128,611,328 bp
Band	7|7 F3	End	128,696,425 bp
RNA expression pattern
Bgee	Human / Mouse (ortholog); Top expressed in: pons; superior vestibular nucleus; lateral nuclear group of thalamus; Brodmann area 23; orbitofrontal cortex; pars compacta; middle temporal gyrus; ventral tegmental area; secondary oocyte; Region I of hippocampus proper / Top expressed in: nucleus accumbens; pontine nuclei; lateral hypothalamus; dorsal tegmental nucleus; ventral tegmental area; globus pallidus; paraventricular nucleus of hypothalamus; dorsomedial hypothalamic nucleus; suprachiasmatic nucleus; Region I of hippocampus proper; More reference expression data
BioGPS	n/a
Gene ontology
Molecular function	inositol monophosphate 1-phosphatase activity; inositol monophosphate phosphatase activity; protein homodimerization activity; inositol monophosphate 3-phosphatase activity; protein binding; phosphoric ester hydrolase activity; hydrolase activity; inositol monophosphate 4-phosphatase activity; phosphatidylinositol phosphate 4-phosphatase activity; phosphatidylinositol phosphate 5-phosphatase activity; phosphatidylinositol-4-phosphate phosphatase activity
Cellular component	dendrite; clathrin-coated pit; membrane; clathrin-coated endocytic vesicle; cytoplasm; early endosome membrane; endosome; recycling endosome; early endosome; axon; soma
Biological process	phosphatidylinositol catabolic process; cardiac muscle hypertrophy in response to stress; regulation of protein kinase B signaling; phosphatidylinositol-mediated signaling; clathrin-dependent endocytosis; positive regulation of receptor recycling; phosphatidylinositol dephosphorylation; negative regulation of axon regeneration; phosphatidylinositol biosynthetic process; adult locomotory behavior; regulation of endocytic recycling; regulation of cell motility; negative regulation of peptidyl-serine phosphorylation; negative regulation of tyrosine phosphorylation of STAT protein
Sources:Amigo / QuickGO
Orthologs
Databases	NCBI: entry; OMA: entry
Species	Human	Mouse
Entrez	22876	101490
Ensembl	ENSG00000198825	ENSMUSG00000042105
UniProt	Q9Y2H2	Q8CDA1
RefSeq (mRNA)	NM_001243194; NM_001243195; NM_014937	NM_178641; NM_001346517
RefSeq (protein)	NP_001230123; NP_001230124; NP_055752	NP_001333446; NP_848756
Location (UCSC)	Chr 10: 119.73 – 119.83 Mb	Chr 7: 128.61 – 128.7 Mb
PubMed search
- Wikidata
View/Edit Human	View/Edit Mouse

Inositol polyphosphate-5-phosphatase F is a protein that in humans is encoded by the INPP5F gene.

== Function ==
The protein encoded by this gene is an inositol 1,4,5-trisphosphate (InsP3) 5-phosphatase and contains a Sac domain. The activity of this protein is specific for phosphatidylinositol 4,5-bisphosphate and phosphatidylinositol 3,4,5-trisphosphate. Alternatively spliced transcript variants encoding multiple isoforms have been observed for this gene. [provided by RefSeq, Aug 2011].
