= VAC14 =

Protein-coding gene in humans

Identifiers
- Aliases: VAC14, ArPIKfyve, TAX1BP2, TRX, Vac14, PIKFYVE complex component, VAC14 component of PIKFYVE complex
- External IDs: OMIM: 604632; MGI: 2157980; GeneCards: VAC14

Gene location (Human)
Chr.	Chromosome 16 (human)
Band	16q22.1-q22.2	Start	70,687,439 bp
Band	16q22.1-q22.2	End	70,801,160 bp

Gene location (Mouse)
Chr.	Chromosome 8 (mouse)
Band	8 E1|8 57.59 cM	Start	111,345,217 bp
Band	8 E1|8 57.59 cM	End	111,447,030 bp
RNA expression pattern
Bgee	Human / Mouse (ortholog); Top expressed in: stromal cell of endometrium; gonad; muscle of thigh; mucosa of transverse colon; prefrontal cortex; apex of heart; right lobe of liver; anterior cingulate cortex; right frontal lobe; right lobe of thyroid gland / Top expressed in: zygote; tail of embryo; yolk sac; genital tubercle; secondary oocyte; epiblast; right kidney; muscle of thigh; internal carotid artery; external carotid artery; More reference expression data
BioGPS	n/a
Gene ontology
Molecular function	protein binding; signaling receptor activity
Cellular component	organelle membrane; Golgi membrane; endosome; early endosome membrane; endosome membrane; PAS complex; endoplasmic reticulum; late endosome membrane; membrane; intracellular membrane-bounded organelle; extrinsic component of vacuolar membrane
Biological process	viral process; signal transduction; phosphatidylinositol biosynthetic process
Sources:Amigo / QuickGO
Orthologs
Databases	NCBI: entry; OMA: entry
Species	Human	Mouse
Entrez	55697	234729
Ensembl	ENSG00000103043	ENSMUSG00000010936
UniProt	Q08AM6	Q80WQ2
RefSeq (mRNA)	NM_018052; NM_001351157	NM_146216
RefSeq (protein)	NP_060522; NP_001338086	NP_666328
Location (UCSC)	Chr 16: 70.69 – 70.8 Mb	Chr 8: 111.35 – 111.45 Mb
PubMed search
- Wikidata
View/Edit Human	View/Edit Mouse

Protein VAC14 homolog, also known as ArPIKfyve (Associated Regulator of PIKfyve), is a protein that in humans is encoded by the VAC14 gene.

== Function ==
The content of phosphatidylinositol 3,5-bisphosphate (PtdIns(3,5)P2) in endosomal membranes changes dynamically with fission and fusion events that generate or absorb intracellular transport vesicles. The ArPIKfyve protein scaffolds a trimolecular complex to tightly regulate the level of PtdIns(3,5)P2. Other components of this complex are the PtdIns(3,5)P2-synthesizing enzyme PIKFYVE and the Sac1-domain-containing PtdIns(3,5)P2 5-phosphatase Sac3, encoded by the human gene FIG4. VAC14 functions as an activator of PIKFYVE. Studies in VAC14 knockout mice indicate that, in addition to increasing the PtdIns(3,5)P2-producing activity of PIKfyve, VAC14 also controls the steady-state levels of another rare phosphoinositide linked to PIKfyve enzyme activity – phosphatidylinositol 5-phosphate. It is seen that VAC14 is scaffold protein that acts in complex with the lipid kinase PIKfyve which works to phosphorylate phosphatidylinositol-3-phosphate, as well as the counteracting phosphatase FIG4, which removes a phosphate group.

In addition to the formation of the ternary complex with PIKfyve and Sac3, ArPIKfyve is engaged in a number of other interactions. ArPIKfyve forms a stable complex with the PtdIns(3,5)P2-specific phosphatase Sac3, thereby protecting Sac3 from rapid degradation in the proteasome. ArPIKfyve forms a homooligomer through its carboxyl terminus. However, the number of monomers in the ArPIKfyve homooligomer, ArPIKfyve-Sac3 heterodimer or PIKfyve-ArPIKfyve-Sac3 heterotrimer is unknown. Human Vac14/ArPIKfyve also interacts with the PDZ (post-synaptic density) domain of neuronal nitric oxide synthase but the functional significance of this interaction is still unclear. ArPIKfyve facilitates insulin-regulated GLUT4 translocation to the cell surface.

== Mouse models ==
VAC14 knock-out mice die at, or shortly after birth and exhibit massive neurodegeneration. Fibroblasts from these mice display ~50% lower levels of PtdIns(3,5)P2 and PtdIns(5)P. A spontaneous mouse VAC14-point mutation (with arginine substitution of leucine156) is associated with reduced life span (up to 3 weeks), body size, enlarged brain ventricles, 50% decrease in PtdIns(3,5)P2 levels, diluted pigmentation, tremor and impaired motor function.

== Clinical significance ==
In 2016, a new condition caused by mutations of the gene was discovered and named childhood-onset striatonigral degeneration (OMIM 617054). It is thought that the PIKfyve-VAC14-FIG4 complex plays an important role on the maturation of early endosomes to late endosomes/lysosomes. These organelles play critical roles in vesicular trafficking, which move cargo from donor membrane cells to target membranes within the body.
