= 1-phosphatidylinositol-5-phosphate 4-kinase =

Class of enzymes

Identifiers
- EC no.: 2.7.1.149

Databases
- BRENDA: enzyme data
- ExPASy: NiceZyme view
- KEGG: enzyme entry
- MetaCyc: metabolic pathway
- Rhea: reactions
- PDB structures: RCSB PDB PDBe PDBsum
- Gene Ontology: AmiGO / QuickGO
Search
- PMC: articles
- PubMed: articles
- NCBI: proteins

In enzymology, a 1-phosphatidylinositol-5-phosphate 4-kinase (EC 2.7.1.149) is an enzyme that catalyzes the chemical reaction

ATP + 1-phosphatidyl-1D-myo-inositol 5-phosphate $\rightleftharpoons$ ADP + 1-phosphatidyl-1D-myo-inositol 4,5-bisphosphate

Thus, the two substrates of this enzyme are ATP and 1-phosphatidyl-1D-myo-inositol 5-phosphate, whereas its two products are ADP and 1-phosphatidyl-1D-myo-inositol 4,5-bisphosphate.

This enzyme belongs to the family of transferases, specifically those transferring phosphorus-containing groups (phosphotransferases) with an alcohol group as acceptor. The systematic name of this enzyme class is ATP:1-phosphatidyl-1D-myo-inositol-5-phosphate 4-phosphotransferase. This enzyme is also called type II PIP kinase. This enzyme participates in 3 metabolic pathways: inositol phosphate metabolism, phosphatidylinositol signaling system, and regulation of actin cytoskeleton.
