= Fig4 =

Protein-coding gene in the species Homo sapiens

FIG4

Identifiers
- Aliases: FIG4, ALS11, CMT4J, KIAA0274, SAC3, YVS, dJ249I4.1, BTOP, Fig4, FIG4 phosphoinositide 5-phosphatase
- External IDs: OMIM: 609390; MGI: 2143585; GeneCards: FIG4
Enzyme activity
EC #	BRENDA	ExPASy	KEGG	MetaCyc
3.1.3.16	↗	↗	↗	↗
3.1.3.36	↗	↗	↗	↗
3.1.3.86	↗	↗	↗	↗

Gene location (Human)
Chr.	Chromosome 6 (human)
Band	6q21	Start	109,690,609 bp
Band	6q21	End	109,878,098 bp

Gene location (Mouse)
Chr.	Chromosome 10 (mouse)
Band	10|10 B1	Start	41,064,168 bp
Band	10|10 B1	End	41,179,256 bp
RNA expression pattern
Bgee	Human / Mouse (ortholog); Top expressed in: middle temporal gyrus; endothelial cell; lateral nuclear group of thalamus; monocyte; Brodmann area 23; pars compacta; pars reticulata; parotid gland; Achilles tendon; nucleus accumbens / Top expressed in: interventricular septum; right ventricle; epithelium of lens; myocardium of ventricle; spinal ganglia; facial motor nucleus; lumbar spinal ganglion; atrioventricular valve; medial ganglionic eminence; atrium; More reference expression data
BioGPS	n/a
Gene ontology
Molecular function	phosphatidylinositol-3-phosphatase activity; phosphatidylinositol-4-phosphate phosphatase activity; phosphatidylinositol-3,5-bisphosphate 5-phosphatase activity; protein binding; phosphatidylinositol bisphosphate phosphatase activity; phosphoric ester hydrolase activity; hydrolase activity
Cellular component	Golgi membrane; late endosome membrane; endosome; recycling endosome; membrane; endoplasmic reticulum; early endosome membrane; endosome membrane; Golgi apparatus; lipid droplet; intracellular membrane-bounded organelle
Biological process	locomotory behavior; phosphatidylinositol biosynthetic process; neuron development; phosphatidylinositol metabolic process; positive regulation of neuron projection development; dephosphorylation; pigmentation; myelin assembly; negative regulation of myelination; vacuole organization; phosphatidylinositol-3-phosphate biosynthetic process
Sources:Amigo / QuickGO
Orthologs
Databases	NCBI: entry; OMA: entry
Species	Human	Mouse
Entrez	9896	103199
Ensembl	ENSG00000112367	ENSMUSG00000038417
UniProt	Q92562	Q91WF7
RefSeq (mRNA)	NM_014845	NM_133999
RefSeq (protein)	NP_055660	NP_598760
Location (UCSC)	Chr 6: 109.69 – 109.88 Mb	Chr 10: 41.06 – 41.18 Mb
PubMed search
- Wikidata
View/Edit Human	View/Edit Mouse

Polyphosphoinositide phosphatase also known as phosphatidylinositol 3,5-bisphosphate 5-phosphatase or SAC domain-containing protein 3 (Sac3) is an enzyme that in humans is encoded by the FIG4 gene. Fig4 is an abbreviation for Factor-Induced Gene.

== Function ==
Sac3 protein belongs to a family of human phosphoinositide phosphatases containing a Sac1-homology domain. The Sac1 phosphatase domain encompasses approximately 400 amino acids and consists of seven conserved motifs. It harbors the signature CX5R (T/S) catalytic sequence also found in other lipid and protein tyrosine phosphatases. The founding protein, containing this evolutionarily-conserved domain, has been the first gene product isolated in a screen for Suppressors of yeast ACtin mutations and therefore named Sac1. There are 5 human genes containing a Sac1 domain. Three of these genes (gene symbols SACM1L, INPP5F and FIG4), harbor a single Sac1 domain. In the other two genes, synaptojanin 1 and 2, the Sac1 domain coexists with another phosphoinositide phosphatase domain, with both domains supporting phosphate hydrolysis. In humans, the FIG4 gene localizes on chromosome 6 and encodes a Sac3 protein of 907 amino acids. Sac3 is characterized as a widespread 97-kDa protein that, in in vitro assays, displays phosphatase activity towards a range of 5'-phosphorylated phosphoinositides. Sac3 forms a hetero-oligomer with ArPIKfyve (gene symbol, VAC14) and this binary complex associates with the phosphoinositide kinase PIKFYVE in a ternary PAS complex (from the first letters of PIKfyve-ArPIKfyve-Sac3), which is required to maintain proper endosomal membrane dynamics. This unique physical association of two enzymes with opposing functions leads to activation of the phosphoinositide kinase PIKfyve and increases of PIKfyve-catalized PtdIns(3,5)P2 and PtdIns5P production. Sac3 is active as a phosphatase in the triple complex and is responsible for turning over PtdIns(3,5)P2 to PtdIns3P. The PAS complex function is critical for life, because the knockout of each of the 3 genes encoding the PIKfyve, ArPIKfyve or Sac3 protein causes early embryonic, perinatal, or early juvenile lethality in mice. Ectopically expressed Sac3 protein has a very short half-life of only ~18 min due to fast degradation in the proteasome. Co-expression of ArPIKfyve markedly prolongs Sac3 half-life, whereas siRNA-mediated ArPIKfyve knockdown profoundly reduces Sac3 levels. Thus, the Sac3 cellular levels are critically dependent on Sac3 physical interaction with ArPIKfyve. The C-terminal part of Sac3 is essential for this interaction. Insulin treatment of 3T3L1 adipocytes inhibits the Sac3 phosphatase activity as measured in vitro. Small interfering RNA-mediated knockdown of endogenous Sac3 by ~60%, resulting in a slight but significant elevation of PtdIns(3,5)P2 in 3T3L1 adipocytes, increases GLUT4 translocation and glucose uptake in response to insulin. In contrast, ectopic expression of Sac3, but not that of a phosphatase-deficient point-mutant, decreases GLUT4 plasma membrane abundance in response to insulin. Thus, Sac3 is an insulin-sensitive lipid phosphatase whose down-regulation improves insulin responsiveness.

== Medical significance ==
Mutations in the FIG4 gene cause a rare autosomal recessive Charcot-Marie-Tooth peripheral neuropathy type 4J (CMT4J). Most CMT4J patients (15 out of the reported 16) are compound heterozygotes, i.e., the one FIG4 allele is null whereas the other encodes a mutant protein with threonine for isoleucine substitution at position 41. The Sac3I41T point mutation abrogates the protective action of ArPIKfyve on Sac3 half-life. As a result mutant Sac3 is rapidly degraded in the proteasome. Consequently, the Sac3I41T protein level in patient fibroblasts is from very low to undetectable. Clinically, the onset and severity of CMT4J symptoms vary markedly, suggesting an important role of genetic background in the individual course of disease. In two siblings, with severe peripheral motor deficits and moderate sensory symptoms, the disease had relatively little impact on the central nervous system. Phosphoinositide profiling in fibroblasts derived from the largest CMT4J cohort reported in USA thus far reveals decreased steady-state levels of both PtdIns(3,5)P2 and PtdIns5P. This unexpected direction of the changes is a result of impaired activation of the PIKFYVE kinase under the condition of Sac3 protein deficiency and a failure of the PAS complex assembly. The reduction in PtdIns(3,5)P2 and PtdIns5P levels is reportedly unrelated to gender or the disease onset, suggesting that the pathological decline in levels of the two lipids might precede the disease symptoms. FIG4 mutations are also found (without proven causation) in patients with amyotrophic lateral sclerosis (ALS) as well as in other spectrum of phenotypes such as Yunis-Varon syndrome, cortical malformation with seizures and psychiatric co-morbidities, and cerebral hypomyelination.

== Mouse models ==
Spontaneous FIG4 knockout leads to mutant mice with smaller size, selectively reduced PtdIns(3,5)P2 levels in isolated fibroblasts, diluted pigmentation, central and peripheral neurodegeneration, hydrocephalus, abnormal tremor and gait, and eventually juvenile lethality, hence the name pale tremor mouse (plt). Neuronal autophagy has been suggested as an important consequence of the knockout, however, its primary relevance is disputed. The plt mice show distinct morphological defects in motor and central neurons on the one hand, and sensory neurons - on the other. Transgenic mice with one spontaneously null allele and another encoding several copies of mouse Sac3I41T mutant (i.e., the genotypic equivalent of human CMT4J), are dose-dependently rescued from the lethality, neurodegeneration, and brain apoptosis observed in the plt mice. However, the hydrocephalus and diluted pigmentation seen in plt mice are not corrected.

== Evolutionary biology ==
Genes encoding orthologs of human Sac3 are found in all eukaryotes. The most studied is the S. cerevisiae gene, discovered in a screen for yeast pheromone (Factor)-Induced Genes, hence the name Fig, with the number 4 reflecting the serendipity of isolation. Yeast Fig4p is a specific PtdIns(3,5)P2 5'-phosphatase, which physically interacts with Vac14p (the ortholog of human ArPIKfyve), and the PtdIns(3,5)P2-producing enzyme Fab1p (the ortholog of PIKfyve). The yeast Fab1p-Vac14p-Fig4p complex also involves Vac7p and potentially Atg18p. Deletion of Fig4p in budding yeast has relatively little effect on growth, basal PtdIns(3,5)P2 levels and the vacuolar size in comparison with the deletions of Vac14p or Fab1p. In brief, in evolution Sac3/Fig4 retained the Sac1 domain, phosphoinositide phosphatase activity, and the protein interactions from yeast. In mice, the protein is essential in early postnatal development. In humans, its I41T point mutation in combination with a null allele causes a neurodegenerative disorder.
