= Phosphatidylinositol 3,5-bisphosphate =

Chemical compound

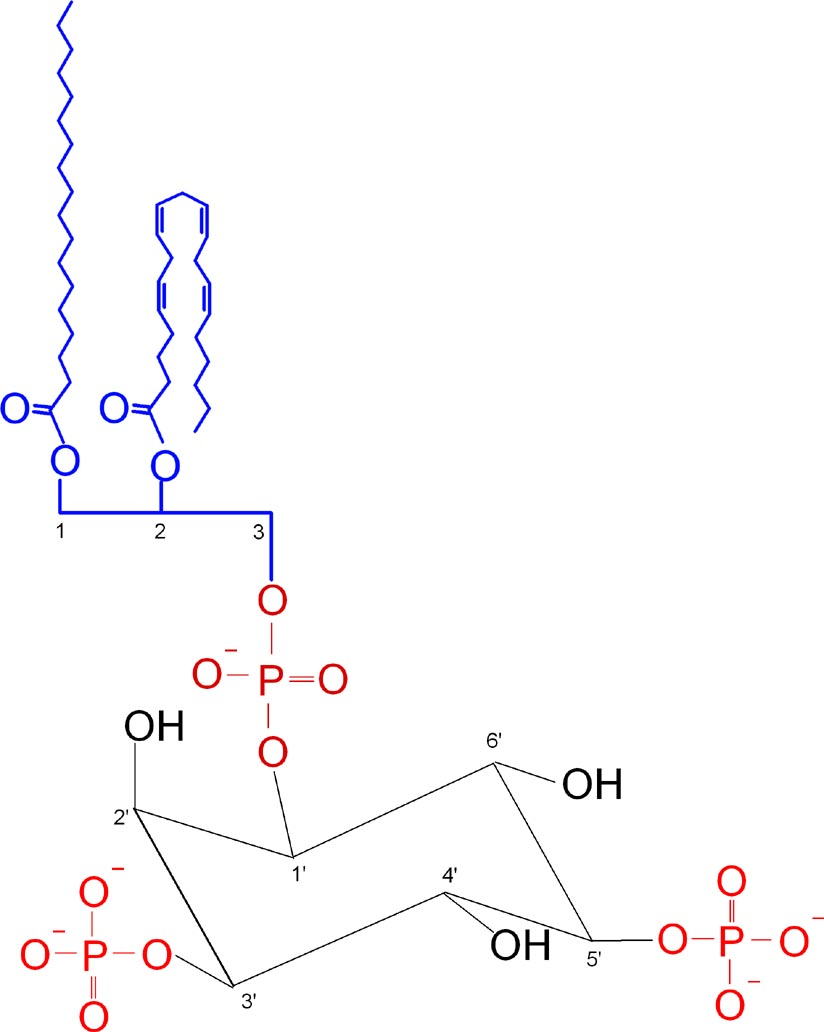
Phosphatidylinositol 3,5-bisphosphate 2d representation

Phosphatidylinositol 3,5-bisphosphate (PtdIns(3,5)P2) is one of the seven phosphoinositides found in eukaryotic cell membranes. In quiescent cells, the PtdIns(3,5)P2 levels, typically quantified by HPLC, are the lowest amongst the constitutively present phosphoinositides. They are approximately 3 to 5-fold lower as compared to PtdIns3P and PtdIns5P (Phosphatidylinositol 5-phosphate) levels, and more than 100-fold lower than the abundant PtdIns4P (Phosphatidylinositol 4-phosphate) and PtdIns(4,5)P2. PtdIns(3,5)P2 was first reported to occur in mouse fibroblasts and budding yeast S. cerevisiae in 1997. In S. cerevisiae PtdIns(3,5)P2 levels increase dramatically during hyperosmotic shock. The response to hyperosmotic challenge is not conserved in most tested mammalian cells except for differentiated 3T3L1 adipocytes.

== Metabolism ==
The only currently known pathway for PtdIns(3,5)P2 production is through synthesis catalyzed by the phosphoinositide kinase PIKfyve. Pulse-chase experiments in mouse fibroblasts reveal that PtdIns(3,5)P2 is reverted to PtdIns3P soon after its synthesis. In mammalian cells, PtdIns(3,5)P2 is synthesized from and turned over to PtdIns3P by a unique protein complex containing two enzymes with opposite activities: the phosphoinositide kinase PIKfyve and the Sac1 domain-containing PtdIns(3,5)P2 5-phosphatase, Sac3/Fig4. The two enzymes do not interact directly. Rather, they are brought together by an associated regulator of PIKfyve, called ArPIKfyve/VAC14, that scaffolds a ternary regulatory complex, known as the PAS complex (from the first letters of PIKfyve/ArPIKfyve/Sac3). PIKfyve attaches the PAS complex onto Rab5GTP/PtdIns3P-enriched endosomal microdomains via its FYVE finger domain that selectively binds PtdIns3P. The essential role of the PAS complex in PtdIns(3,5)P2 synthesis and turnover is supported by data from siRNA-mediated protein silencing and heterologous expression of the PAS complex components in various cell types as well as by data from genetic knockout of the PAS complex proteins.

An additional pathway for PtdIns(3,5)P2 turnover involves the myotubularin family of phosphatases. Myotubularin 1 and MTMR2 dephosphorylate the 3-position of PtdIns(3,5)P2; therefore, the product of this hydrolysis is PtdIns5P, rather than PtdIns3P. The PAS complex proteins are evolutionarily conserved with orthologs found in S. cerevisiae (i.e., Fab1p, Vac14p, and Fig4p proteins) as well as in all eukaryotes with sequenced genomes. Therefore, it is believed that PtdIns(3,5)P2 is present in all eukaryotes where it regulates similar cellular functions. Yeast Fab1p, Vac14p, and Fig4p also form a complex, called the Fab1 complex. However, the Fab1 complex contains additional proteins, which might add an additional layer of PtdIns(3,5)P2 regulation in yeast. The composition of the protein complexes regulating PtdIns(3,5)P2 levels in other species is yet to be clarified.

== Functions and regulation ==
PtdIns(3,5)P2 regulates endosomal operations (fission and fusion) that maintain endomembrane homeostasis and proper performance of the trafficking pathways emanating from or traversing endosomes. Decrease of PtdIns(3,5)P2 levels upon perturbations of cellular PIKfyve by heterologous expression of enzymatically inactive PIKfyve point mutants, siRNA-medicated silencing, pharmacological inhibition and PIKFYVE knockout all cause formation of multiple cytosolic vacuoles, which become larger over time. Importantly, the vacuolation induced by PIKfyve dysfunction and PtdIns(3,5)P2 depletion is reversible and could be selectively rescued by cytosolic microinjection of PtdIns(3,5)P2, overexpression of PIKfyve or wash-out of the PIKfyve inhibitor YM201636. Sac3 phosphatase activity in the PAS complex also plays an important role in regulating PtdIns(3,5)P2 levels and maintaining endomembrane homeostasis. Thus, cytoplasmic vacuolation induced by the dominant-negative PIKfyveK1831E mutant is suppressed upon co-expression of a Sac3 phosphatase-inactive point-mutant along with ArPIKfyve. In vitro reconstitution assays of endosome fusion and multivesicular body (MVB) formation/detachment (fission) suggest a positive role of PtdIns(3,5)P2 in MVB fission from maturing early endosomes and a negative role in endosome fusion. PtdIns(3,5)P2 is implicated in the microtubule-dependent retrograde transport from early/late endosomes to the trans Golgi network.

Acute insulin treatment increases PtdIns(3,5)P2 levels in 3T3L1 adipocytes, both in isolated membranes and intact cells to promote insulin effect on GLUT4 cell surface translocation and glucose transport. These cells also show a marked PtdIns(3,5)P2 increase upon hyperosmotic shock. Other stimuli, including mitogenic signals such as IL-2 and UV light in lymphocytes, activation of protein kinase C by PMA in platelets and EGF stimulation of COS cells, also increase PtdIns(3,5)P2 levels.

PtdIns(3,5)P2 plays a key role in growth and development as evidenced by the preimplantation lethality of the PIKfyve knockout mouse model. The fact that the heterozygous PIKfyve mice are ostensibly normal and live to late adulthood with only ~60% of the wild-type PtdIns(3,5)P2 levels suggests that PtdIns(3,5)P2 might normally be in excess.

ArPIKfyve/Vac14 or Sac3/Fig4 knockout in mice results in a 30-50% decrease in PtdIns(3,5)P2 levels and cause similar massive central neurodegeneration and peripheral neuropathy. These studies suggest that reduced PtdIns(3,5)P2 levels, by a yet-to-be identified mechanism, mediate neuronal death. In contrast, MTMR2 phosphatase knockout, which also causes peripheral neuropathy, is accompanied by elevation in PtdIns(3,5)P2. Thus, whether and how the abnormal levels of PtdIns(3,5)P2 selectively affect peripheral neuronal functions remains unclear.

== Effectors ==
Phosphoinositides are generally viewed as membrane-anchored signals recruiting specific cytosolic effector proteins. So far, several proteins have been proposed as potential PtdIns(3,5)P2 effectors. Unfortunately, the expectations that such effectors would be evolutionary conserved and share a common PtdIns(3,5)P2-binding motif of high affinity remain unfulfilled. For example, deletion of Atg18p, a protein involved also in autophagy in S. cerevisiae, causes enlarged vacuole and 10-fold elevation in PtdIns(3,5)P2. Atg18p binds PtdIns(3,5)P2 with high affinity and specificity. However, except for autophagy, the mammalian orthologs of Atg18p do not share similar functions. Two other yeast proteins (Ent3p and Ent5p) found in prevacuolar and endosomal structures are potential PtdIns(3,5)P2 effectors in MVB sorting. They contain a phosphoinositide-binding ENTH domain and their deletion causes MVB sorting defects resembling those reported for Fab1p deletion. However, neither Ent3p nor Ent5p possess preferential and high affinity binding specificity towards PtdIns(3,5)P2 in vitro. Mammalian VPS24 (a member of the charged multivesicular body proteins (CHMPs) family) is another putative PtdIns(3,5)P2 effector. Alas, surface plasmon resonance measurements do not support specific or high-affinity recognition of PtdIns(3,5)P2 for both mammalian and yeast VPS24. The human transmembrane cationic channel TRPML1 (whose genetic inactivation causes lysosomal storage disease) has been recently put forward as PtdIns(3,5)P2 effector, based on in vitro binding assays and its ability to rescue the vacuolation phenotype in fibroblasts from ArPIKfyve/Vac14 knockout mice. But the deletion of the orthologous protein in yeast does not cause vacuole enlargement, thus casting doubts about the evolutionary conservation of this effector mechanism. Further studies are needed to validate these or uncover yet unknown PtdIns(3,5)P2 effectors.
