= SACM1L =

Protein-coding gene in the species Homo sapiens

Identifiers
- Aliases: SACM1L, SAC1, SAC1 suppressor of actin mutations 1-like (yeast), SAC1 suppressor of actin mutations 1 like (yeast), SAC1 like phosphatidylinositide phosphatase
- External IDs: OMIM: 606569; MGI: 1933169; GeneCards: SACM1L
Enzyme activity
| EC # | BRENDA | ExPASy | KEGG | MetaCyc |
|---|---|---|---|---|
| 3.1.3.64 | ↗ | ↗ | ↗ | ↗ |

Gene location (Human)
| Chr. | Chromosome 3 (human) |
| Band | 3p21.31 | Start | 45,689,056 bp |
| Band | 3p21.31 | End | 45,745,409 bp |

Gene location (Mouse)
| Chr. | Chromosome 9 (mouse) |
| Band | 9 F4|9 74.08 cM | Start | 123,358,824 bp |
| Band | 9 F4|9 74.08 cM | End | 123,421,665 bp |
RNA expression pattern
| Bgee | Human / Mouse (ortholog); Top expressed in: secondary oocyte; Brodmann area 23; lateral nuclear group of thalamus; pars reticulata; endothelial cell; pars compacta; Epithelium of choroid plexus; visceral pleura; lower lobe of lung; renal medulla / Top expressed in: deep cerebellar nuclei; medial vestibular nucleus; facial motor nucleus; substantia nigra; dorsal tegmental nucleus; pontine nuclei; lateral geniculate nucleus; mammillary body; Epithelium of choroid plexus; Paneth cell; More reference expression data |
| BioGPS | n/a |
Gene ontology
| Molecular function | phosphatase activity; phosphoric ester hydrolase activity; phosphatidylinositol bisphosphate phosphatase activity; protein binding; hydrolase activity; phosphatidylinositol-4-phosphate phosphatase activity; phosphatidylinositol-3-phosphatase activity; phosphatidylinositol phosphate 4-phosphatase activity |
| Cellular component | integral component of membrane; Golgi membrane; integral component of endoplasmic reticulum membrane; Golgi apparatus; AMPA glutamate receptor complex; endoplasmic reticulum membrane; endoplasmic reticulum; membrane |
| Biological process | phosphatidylinositol biosynthetic process; phosphatidylinositol dephosphorylation |
Sources:Amigo / QuickGO
Orthologs
| Databases | NCBI: entry; OMA: entry |
| Species | Human | Mouse |
| Entrez | 22908 | 83493 |
| Ensembl | ENSG00000211456 | ENSMUSG00000025240 |
| UniProt | Q9NTJ5 | Q9EP69 |
| RefSeq (mRNA) | NM_014016; NM_001319072; NM_001319073; NM_001319071 | NM_030692; NM_001357485 |
| RefSeq (protein) | NP_001306001; NP_001306002; NP_054735; NP_001306000 | NP_109617; NP_001344414 |
| Location (UCSC) | Chr 3: 45.69 – 45.75 Mb | Chr 9: 123.36 – 123.42 Mb |
| PubMed search |
- Wikidata
| View/Edit Human | View/Edit Mouse |

Phosphatidylinositide phosphatase SAC1 is an enzyme that in humans is encoded by the SACM1L gene.
