= Vacuole =

Membrane-bound organelle in cells containing fluid

Cell biology
- Animal cell diagram
- Components of a typical animal cell: 1. Nucleolus; 2. Nucleus; 3. Ribosome (dots as part of 5); 4. Vesicle; 5. Rough endoplasmic reticulum 6. Golgi apparatus (or, Golgi body); 7. Cytoskeleton; 8. Smooth endoplasmic reticulum 9. Mitochondrion; 10. Vacuole; 11. Cytosol (fluid that contains organelles; with which, comprises cytoplasm); 12. Lysosome; 13. Centrosome; 14. Cell membrane

Plant cell structure

Animal cell structure

A vacuole (/ˈvækjuːoʊl/) is a membrane-bound organelle which is present in plant and fungal cells and some protist, animal, and bacterial cells. Vacuoles are essentially enclosed compartments which are filled with water containing inorganic and organic molecules including enzymes in solution, though in certain cases they may contain solids which have been engulfed. Vacuoles are formed by the fusion of multiple membrane vesicles and are effectively just larger forms of these. The organelle has no basic shape or size; its structure varies according to the requirements of the cell.

== Discovery ==
Antonie van Leeuwenhoek described the plant vacuole in 1676. Contractile vacuoles ("stars") were first observed by Spallanzani (1776) in protozoa, although they were mistaken for respiratory organs. Dujardin (1841) named these "stars" as vacuoles. In 1842, Schleiden applied the term for plant cells, to distinguish the structure with cell sap from the rest of the protoplasm. In 1885, de Vries named the vacuole membrane as tonoplast. Christian de Duve discovered mammalian lysosomes using biochemical methods in the mid-1970s. De Duve named lysosomes based on their biochemical properties (from the Greek lysis – digestive and soma – body). Their physical form was confirmed shortly afterwards by electron microscopy. Because lysosomes share many properties with vacuoles across taxonomic kingdoms, the notion that vacuoles and lysosomes are distinct organelles is more historical than functional.

== Function ==
The function and significance of vacuoles varies greatly according to the type of cell in which they are present, having much greater prominence in the cells of plants, fungi and certain protists than those of animals and bacteria. In general, the functions of the vacuole include:

- Isolating materials that might be harmful or a threat to the cell
- Containing waste products
- Containing water in plant cells
- Maintaining internal hydrostatic pressure or turgor within the cell
- Maintaining an acidic internal pH
- Containing small molecules
- Exporting unwanted substances from the cell
- Allowing plants to support structures such as leaves and flowers due to the pressure of the central vacuole
- By increasing in size, allowing the germinating plant or its organs (such as leaves) to grow very quickly and through using up mostly just water.
- In seeds, storing proteins needed for germination (these are kept in 'protein bodies', which are modified vacuoles).

Vacuoles also play a major role in autophagy, maintaining a balance between biogenesis (production) and degradation (or turnover), of many substances and cell structures in certain organisms. They also aid in the lysis and recycling of misfolded proteins that have begun to build up within the cell. Thomas Boller and others proposed that the vacuole participates in the destruction of invading bacteria and Robert B. Mellor proposed organ-specific forms have a role in 'housing' symbiotic bacteria. In protists, (Note: For example the food vacuole in Plasmodium.) vacuoles have the additional function of storing food which has been absorbed by the organism and assisting in the digestive and waste management process for the cell.

In animal cells, vacuoles perform mostly subordinate roles, assisting in larger processes of exocytosis and endocytosis.

Animal vacuoles are smaller than their plant counterparts but also usually greater in number. There are also animal cells that do not have any vacuoles.

Exocytosis is the extrusion process of proteins and lipids from the cell. These materials are absorbed into secretory granules within the Golgi apparatus before being transported to the cell membrane and secreted into the extracellular environment. In this capacity, vacuoles are simply storage vesicles which allow for the containment, transport and disposal of selected proteins and lipids to the extracellular environment of the cell.

Endocytosis is the reverse of exocytosis and can occur in a variety of forms. Phagocytosis ("cell eating") is the process by which bacteria, dead tissue, or other bits of material visible under the microscope are engulfed by cells. The material makes contact with the cell membrane, which then invaginates. The invagination is pinched off, leaving the engulfed material in the membrane-enclosed vacuole and the cell membrane intact. Pinocytosis ("cell drinking") is essentially the same process, the difference being that the substances ingested are in solution and not visible under the microscope. Phagocytosis and pinocytosis are both undertaken in association with lysosomes which complete the breakdown of the material which has been engulfed.

Salmonella is able to survive and reproduce in the vacuoles of several mammal species after being engulfed.

The vacuole probably evolved several times independently, even within the Viridiplantae.

== Types ==
=== Central ===
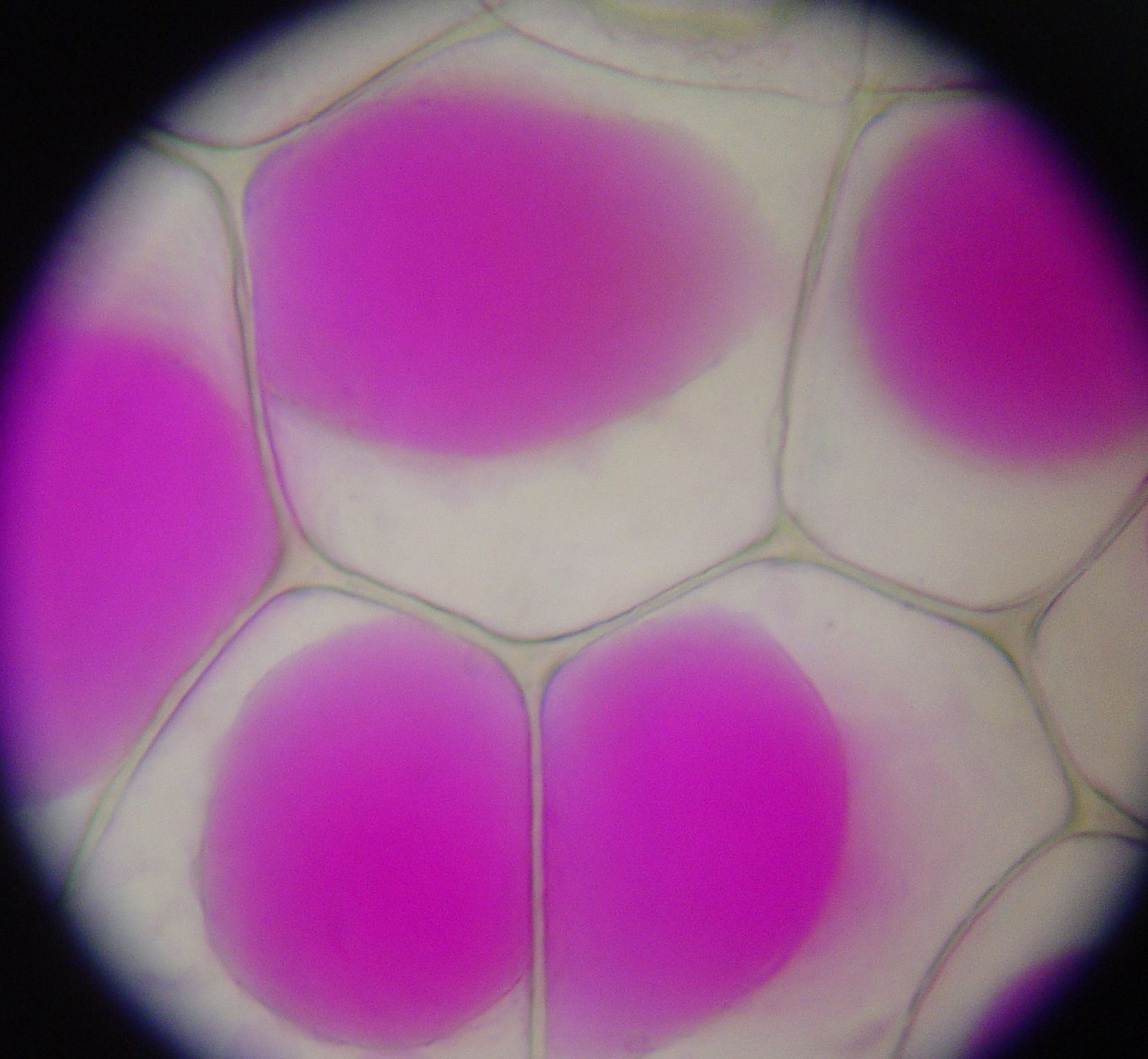
The anthocyanin-storing vacuoles of Rhoeo spathacea, a spiderwort, in cells that have plasmolyzed

Most mature plant cells have one large vacuole that typically occupies more than 30% of the cell's volume, and that can occupy as much as 80% of the volume for certain cell types and conditions. Strands of cytoplasm often run through the vacuole.

A vacuole is surrounded by a membrane called the tonoplast (word origin: Gk tón(os) + -o-, meaning “stretching”, “tension”, “tone” + comb. form repr. Gk plastós formed, molded) and filled with cell sap. Also called the vacuolar membrane, the tonoplast is the cytoplasmic membrane surrounding a vacuole, separating the vacuolar contents from the cell's cytoplasm. As a membrane, it is mainly involved in regulating the movements of ions around the cell, and isolating materials that might be harmful or a threat to the cell.

Transport of protons from the cytosol to the vacuole stabilizes cytoplasmic pH, while making the vacuolar interior more acidic creating a proton motive force which the cell can use to transport nutrients into or out of the vacuole. The low pH of the vacuole also allows degradative enzymes to act. Although single large vacuoles are most common, the size and number of vacuoles may vary in different tissues and stages of development. For example, developing cells in the meristems contain small provacuoles and cells of the vascular cambium have many small vacuoles in the winter and one large one in the summer.

Aside from storage, the main role of the central vacuole is to maintain turgor pressure against the cell wall. Proteins found in the tonoplast (aquaporins) control the flow of water into and out of the vacuole through active transport, pumping potassium (K^{+}) ions into and out of the vacuolar interior. Due to osmosis, water will diffuse into the vacuole, placing pressure on the cell wall. If water loss leads to a significant decline in turgor pressure, the cell will plasmolyze. Turgor pressure exerted by vacuoles is also required for cellular elongation: as the cell wall is partially degraded by the action of expansins, the less rigid wall is expanded by the pressure coming from within the vacuole. Turgor pressure exerted by the vacuole is also essential in supporting plants in an upright position. Another function of a central vacuole is that it pushes all contents of the cell's cytoplasm against the cellular membrane, and thus keeps the chloroplasts closer to light. Most plants store chemicals in the vacuole that react with chemicals in the cytosol. If the cell is broken, for example by a herbivore, then the two chemicals can react forming toxic chemicals. In garlic, alliin and the enzyme alliinase are normally separated but form allicin if the vacuole is broken. A similar reaction is responsible for the production of syn-propanethial-S-oxide when onions are cut.

Vacuoles in fungal cells perform similar functions to those in plants and there can be more than one vacuole per cell. In yeast cells the vacuole (Vac7) is a dynamic structure that can rapidly modify its morphology. They are involved in many processes including the homeostasis of cell pH and the concentration of ions, osmoregulation, storing amino acids and polyphosphate and degradative processes. Toxic ions, such as strontium (Sr^{2+}), cobalt(II) (Co^{2+}), and lead(II) (Pb^{2+}) are transported into the vacuole to isolate them from the rest of the cell.

=== Contractile ===
A contractile vacuole is a specialized osmoregulatory organelle that is present in many free-living protists. The contractile vacuole is part of the contractile vacuole complex which includes radial arms and a spongiome. The contractile vacuole complex works periodically contracts to remove excess water and ions from the cell to balance water flow into the cell. When the contractile vacuole is slowly taking water in, the contractile vacuole enlarges, this is called diastole and when it reaches its threshold, the central vacuole contracts then contracts (systole) periodically to release water.

=== Digestive ===
Food vacuoles (also called digestive vacuole) are organelles found in certain protists, such as ciliates, amoeboids and Plasmodium falciparum, a protozoan parasite that causes malaria.

In Paramecium, the food vacuoles can show variation in size and shape based on their contents, solute balance and timing of ingestion in the cellular pharynx. The vacuoles of Ophrydium versatile undergo discoidal vesicle membrane recycling to the cytostome, condensing in the process, then associate with rough endoplasmic reticulum, receive protein coating on their cytosolic or exterior face from fusion with cup-shaped coated vesicles and condense again while producing cup-shaped coated vesicles, possibly for the purpose of enzyme recycling, prior to cytoproct egestion of residues mediated by vacuole fusion.

The food vacuoles of Plasmodium falciparum have been found to have calcium storage properties mediated by active transport and associated with vacuole acidification that are important for P. falciparum asexual reproduction.

== Histopathology ==
In histopathology, vacuolization is the formation of vacuoles or vacuole-like structures, within or adjacent to cells. It is an unspecific sign of disease.
