= NOMe-seq =

Nucleosome occupancy and methylome technique

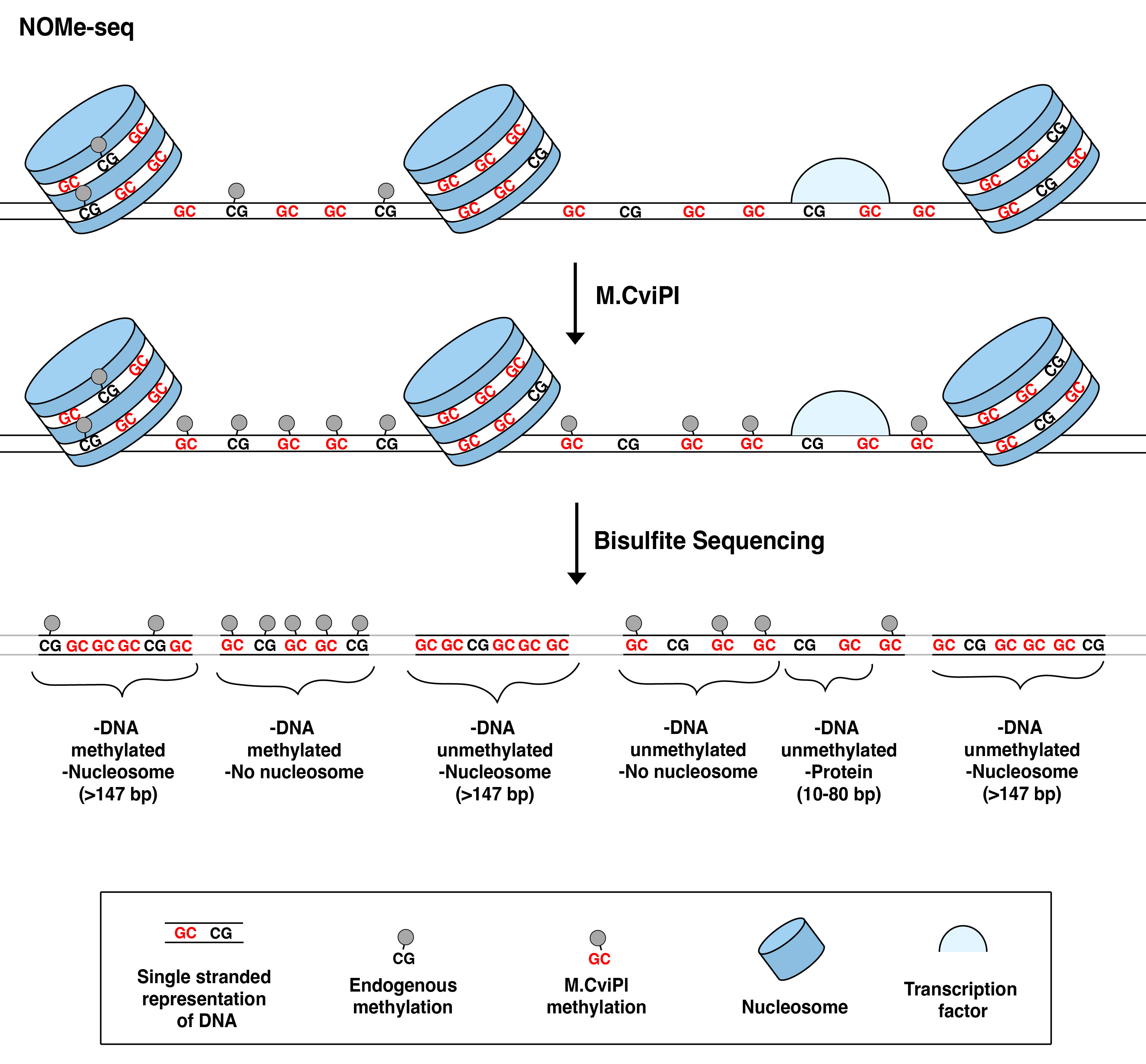
Overview of NOMe-seq

Nucleosome Occupancy and Methylome Sequencing (NOMe-seq) is a genomics technique used to simultaneously detect nucleosome positioning and DNA methylation. This method is an extension of bisulfite sequencing, considered the gold standard for profiling DNA methylation. NOMe-seq relies on the methyltransferase M.CviPl, which methylates cytosines in GpC dinucleotides unbound by nucleosomes or other proteins, creating a nucleosome footprint. The mammalian genome naturally contains DNA methylation, but only at CpG sites, so GpC methylation can be differentiated from genomic methylation after bisulfite sequencing. This allows simultaneous analysis of the nucleosome footprint and endogenous methylation on the same DNA molecules. In addition to nucleosome foot-printing, NOMe-seq can determine locations bound by transcription factors. Nucleosomes are bound by 147 base pairs of DNA whereas transcription factors or other proteins will only bind a region of approximately 10-80 base pairs. Following treatment with M.CviPl, nucleosome and transcription factor sites can be differentiated based on the size of the unmethylated GpC region.

Nucleosome occupancy determines DNA accessibility, which provides insight into regulatory regions of the genome. Important regulatory elements within a cell (such as promoters, enhancers, silencers, etc.), are located in open or accessible regions to allow binding of transcription factors or other regulatory molecules. NOMe-seq can therefore be used to elucidate regulatory information. Alternative DNA accessibility techniques include MNase-seq, DNase-seq, FAIRE-seq, and their successor ATAC-seq. NOMe-seq has the additional benefit of providing DNA methylation status, which also plays a crucial role in the regulation of genomic activity. Interestingly, increased DNA methylation is associated with transcriptional silencing whereas accessible DNA unbound by nucleosomes is generally associated with transcriptional activation. In this sense, NOMe-seq consists of two independent methylation analyses that are functionally oppositional.

== History ==
The M.CviPl methyltransferase was first described in 1998, where the gene was cloned from Chorella virus NYs-1. After its discovery, the methyltransferase was used for nucleosome foot-printing as early as 2004, but NOMe-seq was not officially described until 2012. M.CviPl was not the only methyltransferase used for nucleosome foot-printing; Methylase-sensitive Single Promoter Analysis (M-SPA) was described in 2005 using the CpG methyltransferase M.Sssi. M.CviPl techniques quickly overtook M-SPA as GpC specificity is preferable to CpG specificity, with GpC dinucleotides having a broader distribution throughout the genome and no endogenous methylation. The NOMe-seq assay was subsequently developed, with the earliest mention being in 2011 and an in depth description published in 2012. The technique has since been adapted for single cell technologies, with single cell NOMe-seq (scNOMe-seq) described in 2017 and NOMe-seq using nanopore sequencing (nanoNOMe) described in 2020. These adaptations have allowed high resolution analyses that can compare and contrast DNA accessibility between single cells.

== Methods ==
Components

- For isolating nuclei, components include Dulbecco's phosphate-buffered saline (DPBS), trypsin or dispase (depending on cell type), trypan blue, hemocytometer, lysis buffer, and wash buffer
- To treat nuclei with M.CviPl, components include GpC Buffer, S-adenosylhomocysteine (SAM), M.CviPl, Sucrose, Nuclease-free water, and Stop buffer
- For isolating M.CviPl-treated DNA, components include NaCl, Proteinase K, Phenol:Chloroform (1:1), Ethanol, TE Buffer, and Nandrop spectrophotometer EDTA pH 8
- For fragmenting M.CviPI-treated DNA, components include Covaris sonicator, Covaris MicroTUBE AFA Pre-slit Snap-Cap 6x16mm, Nanodrop Spectrophotometer, and DNA High Sensitivity Kit (Agilent) for use with Agilent 2100 Bioanalyzer
- For bisulfite conversion of M.CviPI-treated DNA, components include EZ DNA Methylation Kit
- For constructing NOMe-seq Library, components include Accel-NGS Methyl-Seq DNA Library Kit for Illumina Platforms, Methyl-Seq Set A Indexing Kit, Magnetic Beads, dsDNA HS Assay Kit, and DNA High Sensitivity Kit

Workflow

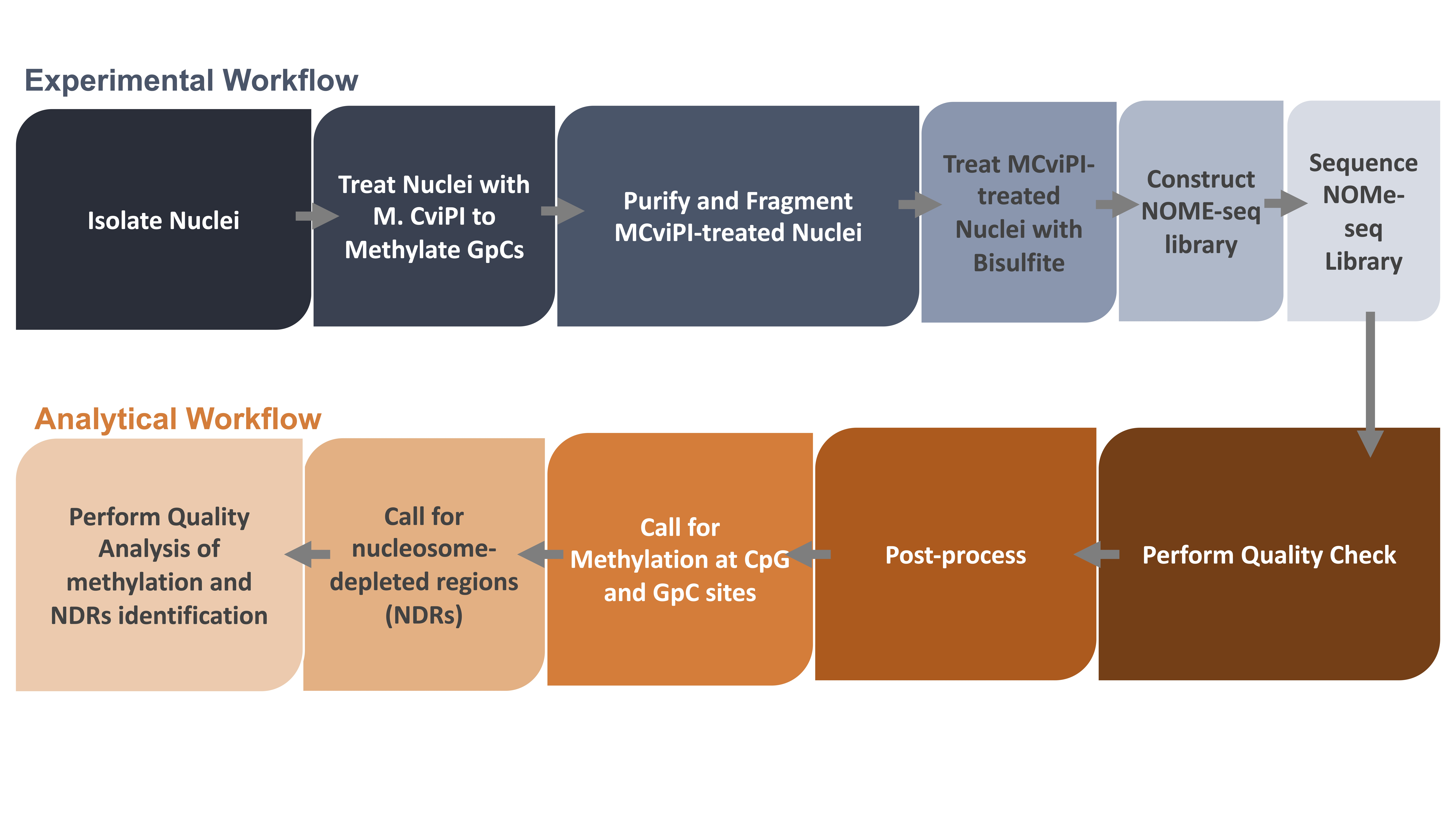
NOMe-seq experimental and analytical workflow

- Isolate nuclei: Lysation of pelleted cells
- Treat nuclei with M. CviPl to methylate GpCs: Incubation with GpC buffer and M.CviPI
- Purify and fragment MCviPl-treated nuclei
- Treat MCviPI-treated nuclei with bisulfite: Conversion of unmethylated Cs to Ts
- Construct NOME-seq library
- Sequence NOMe-seq library
- Perform quality check: Analysis of the sequence by aligning the sequenced genomic clones to bisulfite converted sequence
- Post-process: Analysis of duplicates and coverage quality
- Methylation calling: CpG is found in all HCG trinucleotides; GpC is found in all GCH trinucleotides

== Use ==
=== Advantages ===
- High resolution
- Identifies regulatory elements without needing to understand nucleosome modifications (in comparison to CHIP-seq)
- Greater depth regarding the position of nucleosomes (comparison to DNase-seq, FAIRE-seq, and ATAC-seq.
- Identifies information on dual nucleosome position
- Identifies DNA methylation at a single-DNA molecule resolution
- Relatively short reaction time: 15 minutes while utilizing approximately 200,000 cells.

=== Limitations ===
- Relies on the presence of GpC residues: while the broad distribution of GpCs provides high depth information, mapping is still based on GpC presence in regions unbound by nucleosomes or transcription factors and therefore can not provide single nucleotide resolution
- Higher expense compared to other sequencing methods due to the depth in information generated

== Variations and complementary methods ==
=== scNOMe-seq ===
scNOMe-seq is adapted from NOMe-seq for use in single cells studies. This has been found to produce similar results as NOMe-seq when using bulk samples of human cell cultures. Single cell analyses have many benefits in cases where gene expression can vary between cells. For example, to further develop cancer treatments, it would be useful to understand the differences that arise between individual cells using the scNOMe-seq method.

=== nanoNOMe ===
nanoNOMe is a method that was adapted from NOMe-seq that uses nanopore sequencing instead of bisulfite sequencing. Nanopore sequencing is a long read sequencing method that also detects DNA methylation, providing additional insight into longe range patterns on individual molecules.

=== NOMePlot ===
NOMePlot is a bioinformatic tool that was developed for datasets derived by NOMe-seq. This tool easily obtains single molecule locus-specific information in genome-wide datasets from bulk cell populations and has been validated using mouse embryonic stem cells.

== See also ==
- Pore-C
