= Zero-mode waveguide =

Optical waveguide

A zero-mode waveguide is an optical waveguide that guides light energy into a volume that is small in all dimensions compared to the wavelength of the light.

Zero-mode waveguides have been developed for rapid parallel sensing of zeptolitre sample volumes, as applied to gene sequencing, by Pacific Biosciences (previously named Nanofluidics, Inc.)

A waveguide operated at frequencies lower than its cutoff frequency (wavelengths longer than its cutoff wavelength) and used as a precision attenuator is also known as a "waveguide below-cutoff attenuator."

The zero-mode waveguide is made possible by creating circular or rectangular nanoapertures using focused ion beam on an aluminium layer.

The zero-mode waveguide can also enhance fluorescence signals due to surface plasmons generated at metal-dielectric interfaces. Due to surface plasmon generation field is localized and enhanced as well as it changes the LDOS inside the cavity which leads to increase in Purcell Factor of analyte molecules inside the zero-mode waveguide

The zero-mode waveguide is very useful for Ultraviolet Auto-fluorescence spectroscopy on tryptophan-carrying proteins like beta-galactosidase. With further modification of the zero-mode waveguide with a conical reflector, it is possible to study the dynamic process of smaller proteins like streptavidin with 24 tryptophan. , The modified zero-mode waveguide with a conical reflector can be further optimized to enhance the signal-to-noise ratio and reach the ultimate sensitivity of single tryptophan proteins like TNase.

== See also ==
- Single-molecule real-time sequencing
- Evanescent field
