= ChIL-sequencing =

Method used to analyze protein interactions with DNA

ChIL sequencing (ChIL-seq), also known as Chromatin Integration Labeling sequencing, is a method used to analyze protein interactions with DNA. ChIL-sequencing combines antibody-targeted controlled cleavage by Tn5 transposase with massively parallel DNA sequencing to identify the binding sites of DNA-associated proteins. It can be used to map global DNA binding sites precisely for any protein of interest. Currently, ChIP-Seq is the most common technique utilized to study protein–DNA relations, however, it suffers from a number of practical and economical limitations that ChIL-Sequencing does not. ChIL-Seq is a precise technique that reduces sample loss could be applied to single-cells.

== Uses ==
ChIL-sequencing can be used to examine gene regulation or to analyze transcription factor and other chromatin-associated protein binding. Protein-DNA interactions regulate gene expression and are responsible for many biological processes and disease states. This epigenetic information is complementary to genotype and expression analysis. ChIL-Seq is an alternative to the current standard of ChIP-seq. ChIP-Seq suffers from limitations due to the cross linking step in ChIP-Seq protocols that can promote epitope masking and generate false-positive binding sites. As well, ChIP-seq suffers from suboptimal signal-to-noise ratios and poor resolution. ChIL-sequencing has the advantage of being a simpler technique suitable for low sample input due to the high signal-to-noise ratio, requiring less depth in sequencing for higher sensitivity.

Specific DNA sites in direct physical interaction with proteins such as transcription factors can be isolated by Protein-A (pA) conjugated Tn5 bound to a protein of interest. Tn5 mediated cleavage produces a library of target DNA sites bound to a protein of interest in situ. Sequencing of prepared DNA libraries and comparison to whole-genome sequence databases allows researchers to analyze the interactions between target proteins and DNA, as well as differences in epigenetic chromatin modifications. Therefore, the ChIL-Seq method may be applied to proteins and modifications, including transcription factors, polymerases, structural proteins, protein modifications, and DNA modifications.

=== Protocols ===
There are detailed ChIL-Seq workflows available in an open-access methods repository.

== Limitations ==
The primary limitation of ChIL-seq is the likelihood of over-digestion of DNA due to inappropriate timing of the Magnesium-dependent Tn5 reaction. This is biased towards open chromatin like ATAC-Seq and similar techniques. A similar limitation exists for contemporary ChIP-Seq protocols where enzymatic or sonicated DNA shearing must be optimized. As with ChIP-Seq, a good quality antibody targeting the protein of interest is required. As with other techniques using Tn5, the library preparation has a strong GC bias and has poor sensitivity in low GC regions or genomes with high variance in GC content.

ChIL-Seq requires numerous laboratory steps and takes longer than other techniques such as CUT&RUN or CUT&Tag. It is still a broadly applicable technique which avoids sample loss suitable for small numbers of cells. However, the consumables cost of ChIL-Seq is substantially lower allowing more samples to be processed.

== Similar methods ==
- Sono-Seq: Identical to ChIP-Seq but without the immunoprecipitation step.
- HITS-CLIP: Also called CLIP-Seq, employed to detect interactions with RNA rather than DNA.
- PAR-CLIP: A method for identifying the binding sites of cellular RNA-binding proteins.
- RIP-Chip: Similar to ChIP-Seq, but does not employ cross linking methods and utilizes microarray analysis instead of sequencing.
- SELEX: Employed to determine consensus binding sequences.
- Competition-ChIP: Measures relative replacement dynamics on DNA.
- ChiRP-Seq: Measures RNA-bound DNA and proteins.
- ChIP-exo: Employs exonuclease treatment to achieve up to single base-pair resolution
- ChIP-nexus: Potential improvement on ChIP-exo, capable of achieving up to single base-pair resolution.
- DRIP-seq: Employs S9.6 antibody to precipitate three-stranded DND:RNA hybrids called R-loops.
- TCP-seq: Principally similar method to measure mRNA translation dynamics.
- DamID: Uses enrichment of methylated DNA sequences to detect protein-DNA interaction without antibodies.

== See also ==
- ChIP-on-chip
- ChIP-Seq
- CUT&RUN
- CUT&Tag
