= CUT&Tag sequencing =

Method used to analyze protein interactions with DNA

CUT&Tag-sequencing, also known as cleavage under targets and tagmentation, is a method used to analyze protein interactions with DNA. CUT&Tag-sequencing combines antibody-targeted controlled cleavage by a protein A-Tn5 fusion with massively parallel DNA sequencing to identify the binding sites of DNA-associated proteins. It can be used to map global DNA binding sites precisely for any protein of interest. Currently, ChIP-Seq is the most common technique utilized to study protein–DNA relations, however, it suffers from a number of practical and economical limitations that CUT&RUN and CUT&Tag sequencing do not. CUT&Tag sequencing is an improvement over CUT&RUN because it does not require cells to be lysed or chromatin to be fractionated. CUT&RUN is not suitable for single-cell platforms so CUT&Tag is advantageous for these.

== Uses ==
CUT&Tag-sequencing can be used to examine gene regulation or to analyze transcription factor and other chromatin-associated protein binding. Protein-DNA interactions regulate gene expression and are responsible for many biological processes and disease states. This epigenetic information is complementary to genotype and expression analysis. CUT&Tag is an alternative to the current standard of ChIP-seq. ChIP-Seq suffers from limitations due to the cross linking step in ChIP-Seq protocols that can promote epitope masking and generate false-positive binding sites. As well, ChIP-seq suffers from suboptimal signal-to-noise ratios and poor resolution. CUT&RUN-sequencing and CUT&Tag have the advantage of being simpler techniques with lower costs due to the high signal-to-noise ratio, requiring less depth in sequencing.

Specific DNA sites in direct physical interaction with proteins such as transcription factors can be isolated by Protein-A (pA) conjugated Tn5 bound to a protein of interest. Tn5 mediated cleavage produces a library of target DNA sites bound to a protein of interest in situ. Sequencing of prepared DNA libraries and comparison to whole-genome sequence databases allows researchers to analyze the interactions between target proteins and DNA, as well as differences in epigenetic chromatin modifications. Therefore, the CUT&Tag method may be applied to proteins and modifications, including transcription factors, polymerases, structural proteins, protein modifications, and DNA modifications.

=== Sequencing ===
Unlike ChIP-Seq there is no size selection required before sequencing. A single sequencing run can scan for genome-wide associations with high resolution, due to the low background achieved by performing the reaction in situ with the CUT&RUN-sequencing methodology. ChIP-Seq, by contrast, requires ten times the sequencing depth because of the intrinsically high background associated with the method. The data is then collected and analyzed using software that aligns sample sequences to a known genomic sequence to identify the CUT&Tag DNA fragments.

=== Protocols ===
There are detailed CUT&Tag workflows available in an open-access methods repository.

- CUT&Tag for efficient epigenomic profiling of small samples and single cells
- CUT&Tag for efficient epigenomic profiling of small samples and single cells

== Sensitivity ==
CUT&RUN-sequencing or CUT&Tag-sequencing provide low levels of background signal because of in situ profiling which retains in vivo 3D confirmations of transcription factor-DNA interactions, so antibodies access only exposed surfaces. Sensitivity of sequencing depends on the depth of the sequencing run (i.e. the number of mapped sequence tags), the size of the genome and the distribution of the target factor. The sequencing depth is directly correlated with cost and negatively correlated with background. Therefore, low-background CUT&Tag sequencing is inherently more cost-effective than high-background ChIP-Sequencing.

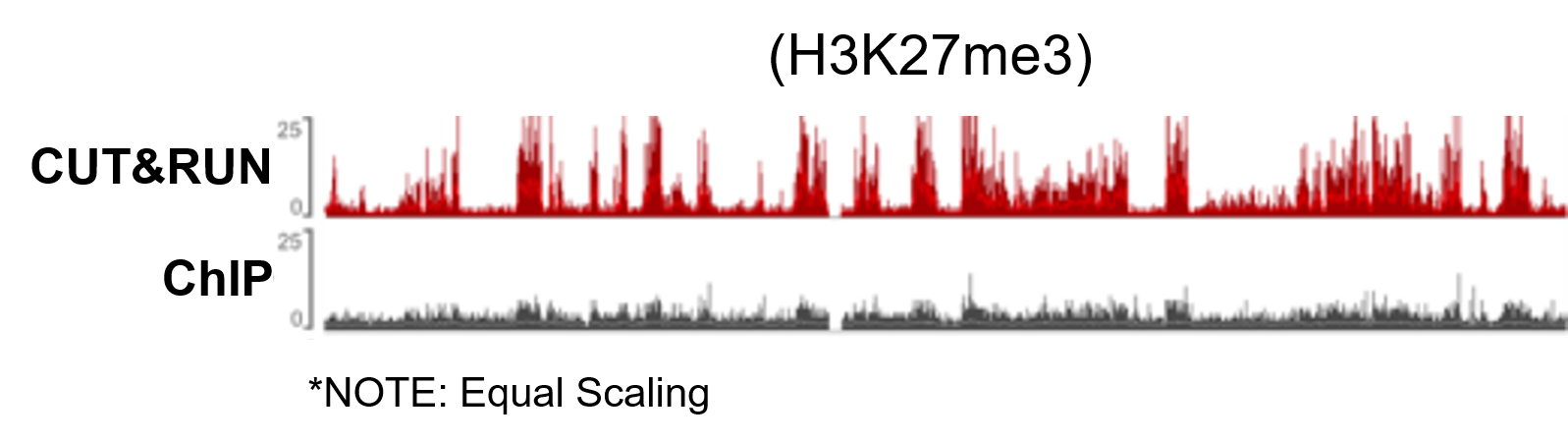
Peak calling representation for H3K27me3 targeted sequencing results, comparing CUT&RUN to traditional ChIP. Note That CUT&RUN and CUT&Tag appears to deliver improved signal-to-noise ratio than traditional ChIP. This advantage translates to lower sequencing costs (and feasibility in single-cells for CUT&Tag).

== Limitations ==
The primary limitation of CUT&Tag is the likelihood of over-digestion of DNA due to inappropriate timing of the Magnesium-dependent Tn5 reaction. A similar limitation exists for contemporary ChIP-Seq protocols where enzymatic or sonicated DNA shearing must be optimized. As with ChIP-Seq, a good quality antibody targeting the protein of interest is required. As with other techniques using Tn5, the library preparation has a strong GC bias and has poor sensitivity in low GC regions or genomes with high variance in GC content.

== Similar methods ==
- Sono-Seq: Identical to ChIP-Seq but without the immunoprecipitation step.
- HITS-CLIP: Also called CLIP-Seq, employed to detect interactions with RNA rather than DNA.
- PAR-CLIP: A method for identifying the binding sites of cellular RNA-binding proteins.
- RIP-Chip: Similar to ChIP-Seq, but does not employ cross linking methods and utilizes microarray analysis instead of sequencing.
- SELEX: Employed to determine consensus binding sequences.
- Competition-ChIP: Measures relative replacement dynamics on DNA.
- ChiRP-Seq: Measures RNA-bound DNA and proteins.
- ChIP-exo: Employs exonuclease treatment to achieve up to single base-pair resolution
- ChIP-nexus: Potential improvement on ChIP-exo, capable of achieving up to single base-pair resolution.
- DRIP-seq: Employs S9.6 antibody to precipitate three-stranded DND:RNA hybrids called R-loops.
- TCP-seq: Principally similar method to measure mRNA translation dynamics.
- DamID: Uses enrichment of methylated DNA sequences to detect protein-DNA interaction without antibodies.
- CUT&RUN: Uses protein A-Mnase

== See also ==
- ChIP-on-chip
- ChIP-Seq
- CUT&RUN
- ChIL-Seq
- ChIP-exo
- ATAC-seq
