= Chirp (disambiguation) =

A chirp is a signal in which the frequency increases or decreases with time.

Chirp may also refer to:

== Sounds ==
- Bird vocalization
- Chirp (rubbing sound), or stridulation, the act of producing sound by rubbing together certain body parts
- Chirp (scratch), a type of scratch performed by turntablists

== Science and technology ==
- CHIRP (algorithm), an algorithm used to perform a deconvolution on radio astronomy images
- Chirp (company), a UK technology company
- Chirp (phone), a walkie-talkie service on Sprint-Nextel's iDEN-phones
- ChiRP-Seq, a biological methodology to identify DNA regions or proteins that are bound to a RNA molecule of interest

== Arts and entertainment ==
- Chirp (magazine), a Canadian children's magazine
- Chirp (TV series), a Canadian children's animated series
- "Chirp" (Modern Family), a television episode
- Chirp, a robin in the TV series Peep and the Big Wide World
- "Chirp", by C418 from Minecraft - Volume Beta, 2013

== See also ==
- Chirping (disambiguation)
