= DNA-binding protein =

Proteins that bind with DNA

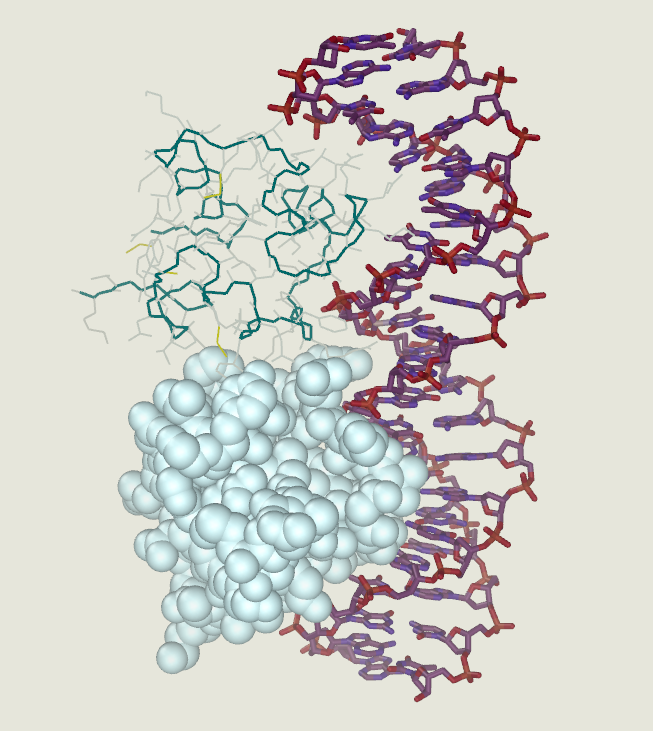
Cro protein complex with DNA

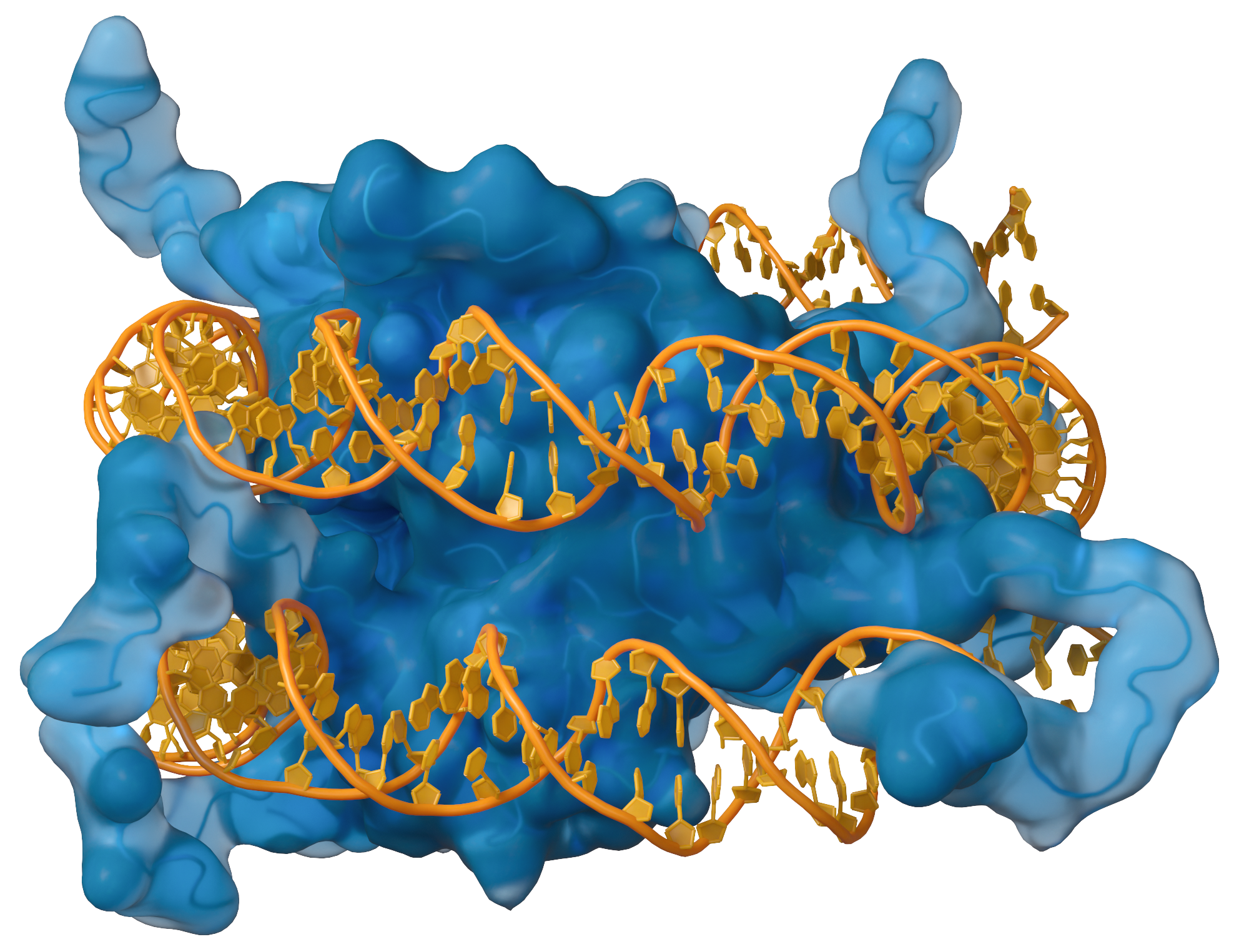
Interaction of DNA (orange) with histones (blue). These proteins' basic amino acids bind to the acidic phosphate groups on DNA.

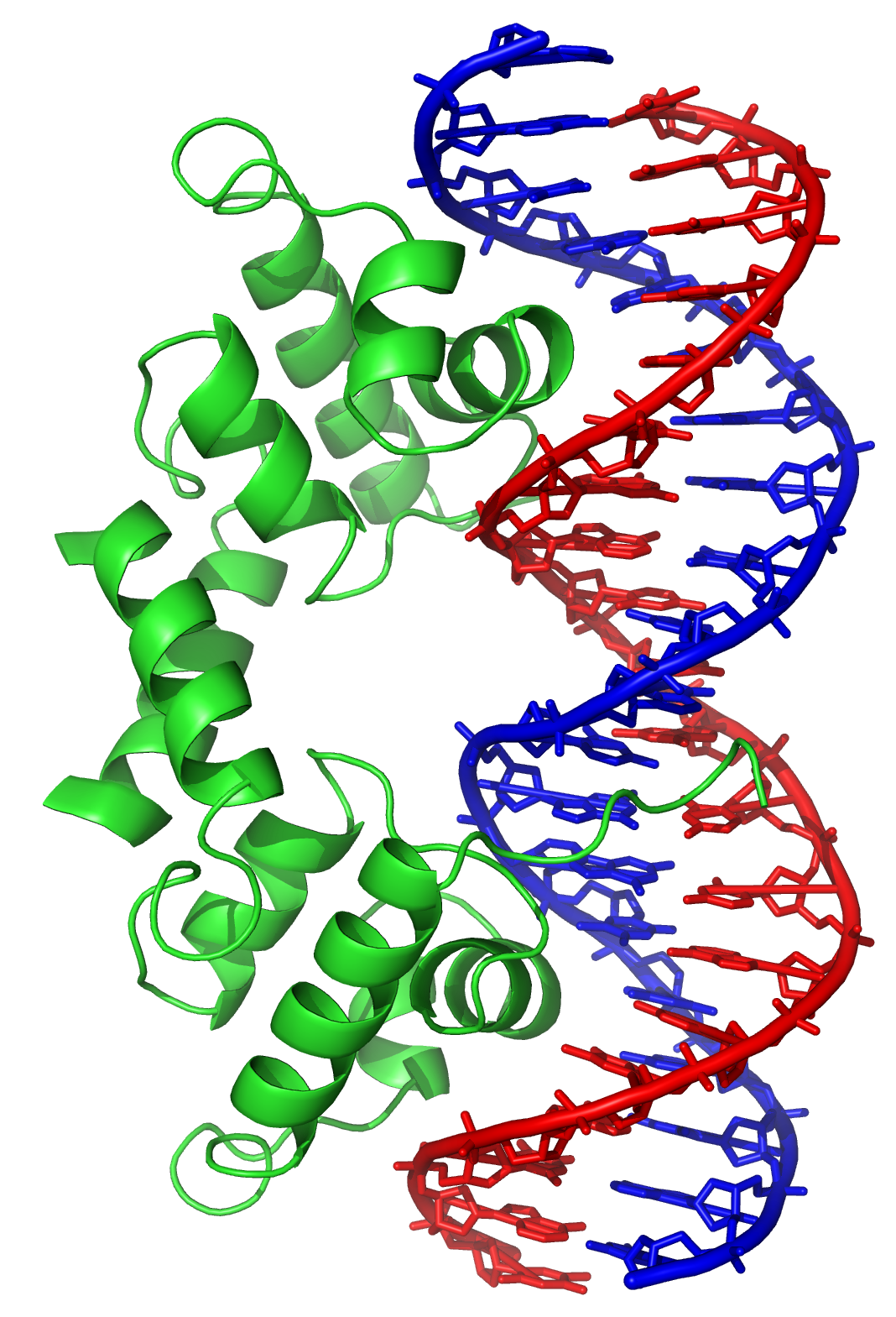
The lambda repressor helix-turn-helix transcription factor bound to its DNA target

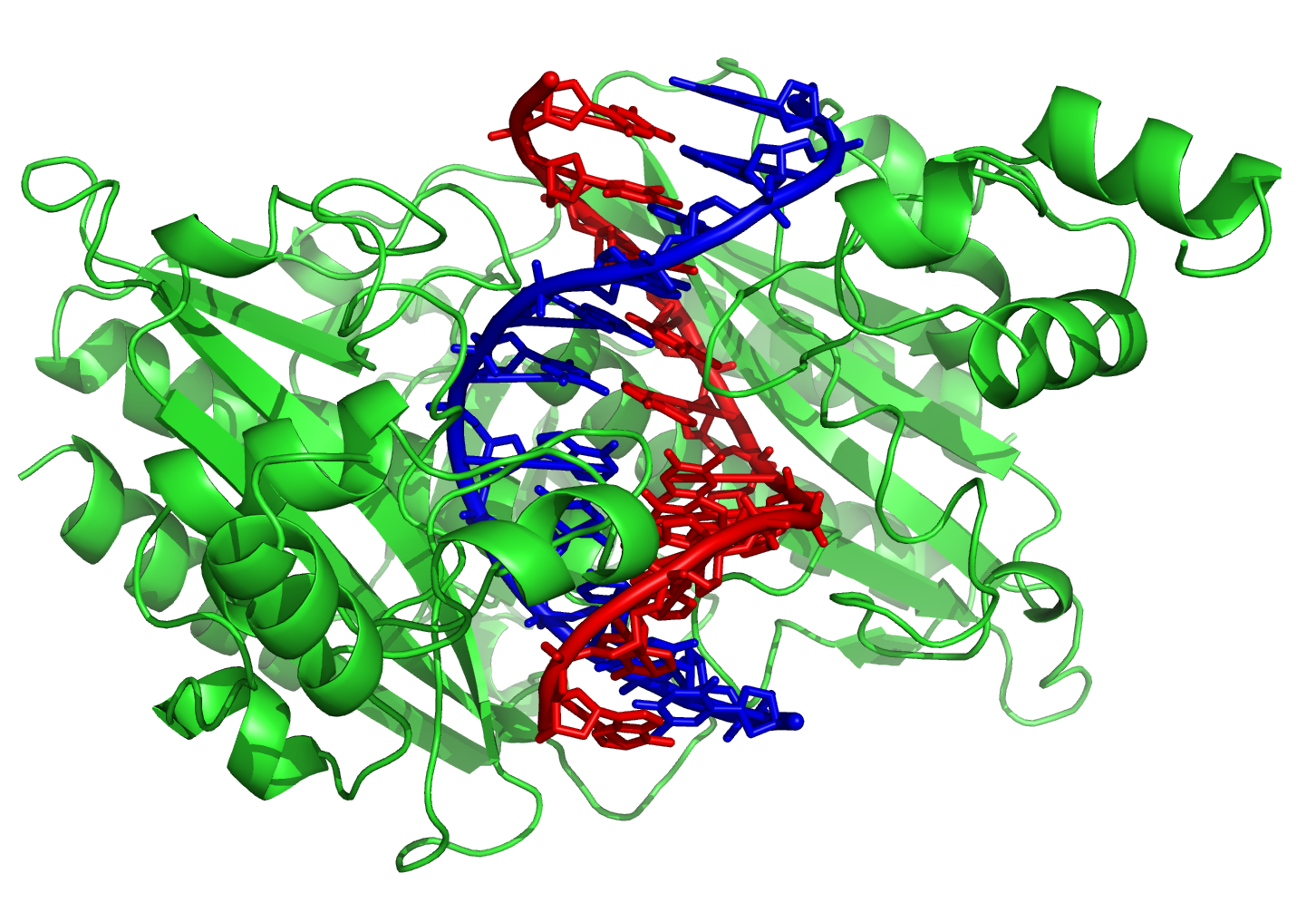
The restriction enzyme EcoRV (green) in a complex with its substrate DNA

DNA-binding proteins are proteins that have DNA-binding domains and thus have a specific or general affinity for single- or double-stranded DNA. Sequence-specific DNA-binding proteins generally interact with the major groove of B-DNA, because it exposes more functional groups that identify a base pair.

== Examples ==
DNA-binding proteins include transcription factors which modulate the process of transcription, various polymerases, nucleases which cleave DNA molecules, and histones which are involved in chromosome packaging and transcription in the cell nucleus. DNA-binding proteins can incorporate such domains as the zinc finger, the helix-turn-helix, and the leucine zipper (among many others) that facilitate binding to nucleic acid. There are also more unusual examples such as transcription activator like effectors.

== Non-specific DNA-protein interactions ==
Structural proteins that bind DNA are well-understood examples of non-specific DNA-protein interactions. Within chromosomes, DNA is held in complexes with structural proteins. These proteins organize the DNA into a compact structure called chromatin. In eukaryotes, this structure involves DNA binding to a complex of small basic proteins called histones. In prokaryotes, multiple types of proteins are involved. The histones form a disk-shaped complex called a nucleosome, which contains two complete turns of double-stranded DNA wrapped around its surface. These non-specific interactions are formed through basic residues in the histones making ionic bonds to the acidic sugar-phosphate backbone of the DNA, and are therefore largely independent of the base sequence. Chemical modifications of these basic amino acid residues include methylation, phosphorylation and acetylation. These chemical changes alter the strength of the interaction between the DNA and the histones, making the DNA more or less accessible to transcription factors and changing the rate of transcription. Other non-specific DNA-binding proteins in chromatin include the high-mobility group (HMG) proteins, which bind to bent or distorted DNA. Biophysical studies show that these architectural HMG proteins bind, bend and loop DNA to perform its biological functions. These proteins are important in bending arrays of nucleosomes and arranging them into the larger structures that form chromosomes. Recently FK506 binding protein 25 (FBP25) was also shown to non-specifically bind to DNA which helps in DNA repair.

== Proteins that specifically bind single-stranded DNA ==
A distinct group of DNA-binding proteins are the DNA-binding proteins that specifically bind single-stranded DNA. In humans, replication protein A is the best-understood member of this family and is used in processes where the double helix is separated, including DNA replication, recombination and DNA repair. These binding proteins seem to stabilize single-stranded DNA and protect it from forming stem-loops or being degraded by nucleases.

== Binding to specific DNA sequences ==
DNA contacts of different types of DNA-binding domains from transcription factors

In contrast, other proteins have evolved to bind to specific DNA sequences. The most intensively studied of these are the various transcription factors, which are proteins that regulate transcription. Each transcription factor binds to one specific set of DNA sequences and activates or inhibits the transcription of genes that have these sequences near their promoters. The transcription factors do this in two ways. Firstly, they can bind the RNA polymerase responsible for transcription, either directly or through other mediator proteins; this locates the polymerase at the promoter and allows it to begin transcription. Alternatively, transcription factors can bind enzymes that modify the histones at the promoter. This alters the accessibility of the DNA template to the polymerase.

These DNA targets can occur throughout an organism's genome. Thus, changes in the activity of one type of transcription factor can affect thousands of genes. Thus, these proteins are often the targets of the signal transduction processes that control responses to environmental changes or cellular differentiation and development. The specificity of these transcription factors' interactions with DNA come from the proteins making multiple contacts to the edges of the DNA bases, allowing them to read the DNA sequence. Most of these base-interactions are made in the major groove, where the bases are most accessible. Mathematical descriptions of protein-DNA binding taking into account sequence-specificity, and competitive and cooperative binding of proteins of different types are usually performed with the help of the lattice models. Computational methods to identify the DNA binding sequence specificity have been proposed to make a good use of the abundant sequence data in the post-genomic era. In addition, progress has happened on structure-based prediction of binding specificity across protein families using deep learning.

== Protein–DNA interactions ==
Protein–DNA interactions occur when a protein binds a molecule of DNA, often to regulate the biological function of DNA, usually the expression of a gene. Among the proteins that bind to DNA are transcription factors that activate or repress gene expression by binding to DNA motifs and histones that form part of the structure of DNA and bind to it less specifically. Also proteins that repair DNA such as uracil-DNA glycosylase interact closely with it.

In general, proteins bind to DNA in the major groove; however, there are exceptions. Protein–DNA interactions are of mainly two types, either specific interaction, or non-specific interaction. Recent single-molecule experiments showed that DNA binding proteins undergo rapid rebinding in order to bind in correct orientation for recognizing the target site.

=== Design ===
Designing DNA-binding proteins that have a specified DNA-binding site has been an important goal for biotechnology. Zinc finger proteins have been designed to bind to specific DNA sequences and this is the basis of zinc finger nucleases. Recently transcription activator-like effector nucleases (TALENs) have been created which are based on natural proteins secreted by Xanthomonas bacteria via their type III secretion system when they infect various plant species.

=== Detection methods ===
There are many in vitro and in vivo techniques which are useful in detecting DNA-Protein Interactions. The following lists some methods currently in use: Electrophoretic mobility shift assay (EMSA) is a widespread qualitative technique to study protein–DNA interactions of known DNA binding proteins. DNA-Protein-Interaction - Enzyme-Linked ImmunoSorbant Assay (DPI-ELISA) allows the qualitative and quantitative analysis of DNA-binding preferences of known proteins in vitro. This technique allows the analysis of protein complexes that bind to DNA (DPI-Recruitment-ELISA) or is suited for automated screening of several nucleotide probes due to its standard ELISA plate formate. DNase footprinting assay can be used to identify the specific sites of binding of a protein to DNA at basepair resolution. Chromatin immunoprecipitation is used to identify the in vivo DNA target regions of a known transcription factor. This technique when combined with high throughput sequencing is known as ChIP-Seq and when combined with microarrays it is known as ChIP-chip. Yeast one-hybrid System (Y1H) is used to identify which protein binds to a particular DNA fragment. Bacterial one-hybrid system (B1H) is used to identify which protein binds to a particular DNA fragment. Structure determination using X-ray crystallography has been used to give a highly detailed atomic view of protein–DNA interactions. Besides these methods, other techniques such as SELEX, PBM (protein binding microarrays), DNA microarray screens, DamID, FAIRE or more recently DAP-seq (DNA affinity purification sequencing) are used in the laboratory to investigate DNA-protein interaction in vivo and in vitro.

=== Manipulating the interactions ===
The protein–DNA interactions can be modulated using stimuli like ionic strength of the buffer, macromolecular crowding, temperature, pH and electric field. This can lead to reversible dissociation/association of the protein–DNA complex.

== See also ==
- bZIP domain
- ChIP-exo
- Comparison of nucleic acid simulation software
- DNA-binding domain
- Helix-loop-helix
- Helix-turn-helix
- HMG-box
- Leucine zipper
- Lexitropsin (a semi-synthetic DNA-binding ligand)
- Deoxyribonucleoprotein
- Protein–DNA interaction site prediction software
- RNA-binding protein
- Single-strand binding protein
- Zinc finger
