= Lattice model =

Lattice model may refer to:

- Lattice model (physics), a physical model that is defined on a periodic structure with a repeating elemental unit pattern, as opposed to the continuum of space or spacetime
- Lattice model (finance), a "discrete-time" model of the varying price over time of the underlying financial instrument, during the life of the instrument
- Lattice model (mathematics), a regular tiling of a space by a primitive cell
- Lattice model (biophysics), a class of Ising-type models for the description of biomacromolecules, their transformations and binding in gene regulation and signal transduction
- Lattice-based access control, a complex access control model based on the interaction between any combination of objects and subjects
