= NT2 =

NT2 may refer to:

- The NTERA-2 human embryonal carcinoma cell line
- The Nam Theun 2 Dam, a hydroelectric dam located on the Nam Theun River in Laos.
- The Staatsexamen Nederlands als tweede taal NT2, a standardised examination for Dutch language in the Netherlands.
- National Treasure: Book of Secrets, the second movie in the National Treasure series.
