= Mammalian promoter database =

MPromDb

Content
- Description: annotation and visualization of mammalian gene promoters and ChIP-seq experimental data.

Contact
- Laboratory: Center for Systems and Computational Biology, Molecular and Cellular Oncogenesis Program, The Wistar Institute, Philadelphia, PA, USA.
- Authors: Ravi Gupta
- Primary citation: Gupta & al. (2011)
- Release date: 2010

Access
- Website: http://bioinformatics.wistar.upenn.edu/MPromDb/

The Mammalian Promoter Database (MPromDb) is a curated database of gene promoters identified from ChIP-seq. The proximal promoter region (upstream of the core-promoter region) contains the cis-regulatory elements of most of the transcription factors (TFs).

Recently, a better approach to annotate active promoters has been demonstrated with a combination of ChIP-seq and computational technique. This technique has been used to find the target genes of TFs in mammalian systems. The MPromDb is based on this technology. Curated promoter sequences for eukaryotic organisms are provided by an EPD database; however, promoter activity information at tissue/ cell centric level is not offered.

The MPromDb data base added active RNAP-II promoters identified after analyzing ten different mouse cell/tissue ChIP-seq experiments performed with RNAP-II antibodies and six different human cell types. The data was acquired by a series of computational methods followed by manual correction to ensure its high level quality. In the newest version of MPromDb, about 507 million uniquely-aligned RNA Pol-II ChIP-seq reads have already been analyzed from 26 different databases, including six human cell-types and 10 distinct mouse cell/tissues.
