= Cistrome =

In simple words, the cistrome refers to a collection of regulatory elements of a set of genes, including transcription factor binding sites and histone modifications (histone acetylation, deacetylation, methylation, demethylation etc.). More specifically, "the set of cis-acting targets of a trans-acting factor on a genome-wide scale, also known as the in vivo genome-wide location of transcription factor binding sites or histone modifications". The term cistrome is a portmanteau of cistr (from cistron) + ome (from genome). The term cistrome was coined by investigators at the Dana–Farber Cancer Institute and Harvard Medical School.

Technologies such as chromatin immunoprecipitation combined with microarray analysis "ChIP-on-chip" or with massively parallel DNA sequencing "ChIP-Seq" have greatly facilitated the definition of the cistrome of transcription factors and other chromatin associated proteins.
