= SETX =

Protein-coding gene in the species Homo sapiens

Identifiers
- Aliases: SETX, ALS4, AOA2, SCAR1, bA479K20.2, senataxin, Sen1, SCAN2, STEX
- External IDs: OMIM: 608465; MGI: 2443480; GeneCards: SETX
Enzyme activity
| EC # | BRENDA | ExPASy | KEGG | MetaCyc |
|---|---|---|---|---|
| 5.6.2.3 | ↗ | ↗ | ↗ | ↗ |

Gene location (Human)
| Chr. | Chromosome 9 (human) |
| Band | 9q34.13 | Start | 132,261,356 bp |
| Band | 9q34.13 | End | 132,354,986 bp |

Gene location (Mouse)
| Chr. | Chromosome 2 (mouse) |
| Band | 2|2 A3- B | Start | 29,014,193 bp |
| Band | 2|2 A3- B | End | 29,072,483 bp |
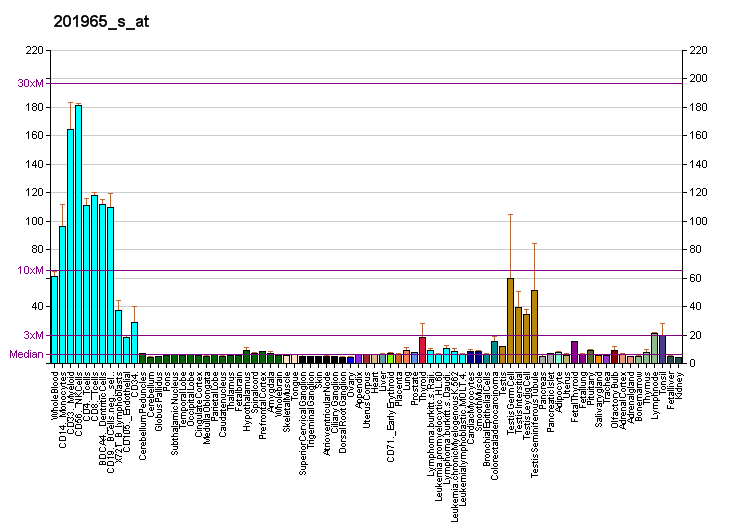

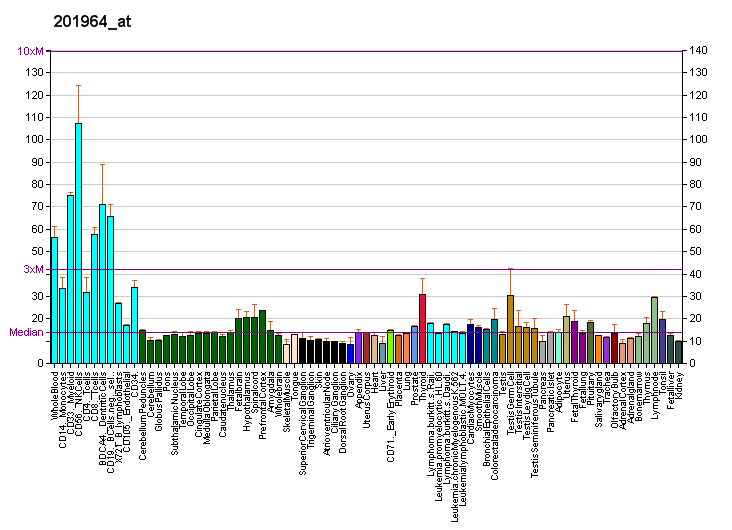
RNA expression pattern
| Bgee | Human / Mouse (ortholog); Top expressed in: right testis; Achilles tendon; left testis; white blood cell; monocyte; granulocyte; right lobe of thyroid gland; testicle; spleen; left lobe of thyroid gland / Top expressed in: spermatocyte; spermatid; seminiferous tubule; hand; superior cervical ganglion; mesenteric lymph nodes; Gonadal ridge; substantia nigra; condyle; foot; More reference expression data |
| BioGPS | More reference expression data |
Gene ontology
| Molecular function | transcription termination site sequence-specific DNA binding; nucleotide binding; protein binding; ATP binding; helicase activity; DNA helicase activity; identical protein binding; hydrolase activity; DNA binding; RNA binding |
| Cellular component | nucleolus; telomere; nuclear chromosome; chromosome; cell projection; cytoplasm; growth cone; nucleoplasm; axon; nucleus; nuclear body; intercellular bridge |
| Biological process | cellular response to fibroblast growth factor stimulus; positive regulation of DNA-templated transcription, termination; fibroblast growth factor receptor signaling pathway; positive regulation of RNA splicing; DNA recombination; cellular response to retinoic acid; nervous system development; positive regulation of neuron projection development; DNA repair; RNA processing; termination of RNA polymerase II transcription; cell differentiation; DNA-templated transcription, termination; mRNA splice site selection; cellular response to hydrogen peroxide; positive regulation of termination of RNA polymerase II transcription, poly(A)-coupled; negative regulation of apoptotic process; positive regulation of DNA-templated transcription, initiation; circadian rhythm; cellular response to oxidative stress; spermatogenesis; protein kinase B signaling; rhythmic process; positive regulation of transcription by RNA polymerase II; MAPK cascade; cellular response to DNA damage stimulus; DNA duplex unwinding; double-strand break repair |
Sources:Amigo / QuickGO
Orthologs
| Databases | NCBI: entry; OMA: entry |
| Species | Human | Mouse |
| Entrez | 23064 | 269254 |
| Ensembl | ENSG00000107290 | ENSMUSG00000043535 |
| UniProt | Q7Z333 | A2AKX3 |
| RefSeq (mRNA) | NM_015046; NM_001351527; NM_001351528 | NM_198033; NM_177365 |
| RefSeq (protein) | NP_055861; NP_001338456; NP_001338457 | NP_932150 |
| Location (UCSC) | Chr 9: 132.26 – 132.35 Mb | Chr 2: 29.01 – 29.07 Mb |
| PubMed search |
- Wikidata
| View/Edit Human | View/Edit Mouse |

Probable helicase senataxin is an enzyme that in humans is encoded by the SETX gene.

This gene encodes a protein named senataxin, a 302kDa protein

== Sequence and structure ==
There is high homology between human SETX and yeast Sen1. Sen1 in yeast is a RNA/DNA helicase and the highly conserved sequences between these genes, particularly in the helicase domain, indicates that SETX in humans may have similar roles in gene expression and maintaining genome stability. In Sen1, the N-terminus has shown interactions with the C-terminal domain of RNA polymerase II, ribonuclease III, and NER factor Rad2/XPG. Meanwhile, the C-terminus encodes the DNA/RNA helicase activity. Similarly, SETX encodes the senataxin protein that has a N-terminal that is likely to be involved with interacting with other proteins. Senataxin interacts with RNA polymerase II and poly(A) binding proteins. At the C-terminal, senataxin has a DEAD box helicase domain.

== Function ==
Although senataxin is widely expressed in many tissues in the body, the cellular roles of senataxin are not completely understood. However, based on current research and examining homologs of SETX, senataxin is thought to play an important role in resolving R-loops, transcription termination, and maintaining genome stability by being an essential component of the DNA-damage response (DDR).

SETX is suspected to be involved in DNA damage repair and maintaining genome stability by working with other proteins in the DNA damage response. R loops may arise from replication stress, such as when transcription and replication occur at the same time at a certain loci. This often occurs when transcribing long genes since transcription of that gene can take longer than one round of replication. When the replisome and transcription machinery collide, R loops can form and double stranded breaks can form. At these collision sites, SETX was shown to co-localize with 53BP1, which is a marker for DNA damage. Furthermore, SETX was observed to promote homologous recombination repair and prevent translocation. To further support SETX's role in DNA damage repair, SETX co-localizes with many other DDR factors. For example, BRCA1 was also shown to recruit SETX to remove R-loops, which prevents DNA mutations that arise as a result of the vulnerable single stranded DNA that is part of the R-loop structure. SETX may be involved in double strand break repair through its involvement in loading RAD51, which is a crucial protein in double strand break repair through homologous recombination.

Furthermore, Senataxin may be involved in transcription termination. A large amount of R-loops are found at the 3’ end of some mammalian genes, after poly-adenylation sites. The R-loops are thought to be involved in transcription termination by stalling RNA polymerase II. The senataxin protein, which has RNA-DNA helicase activity, and DHX9 human helicase can resolve R-loops. This allows XRN2, an exonuclease, to access the 3’ cleavage polyadenylated sites and degrade the 3’ transcript. This ultimately leads to termination of transcription.

== Clinical significance ==
SETX was found to be mutated in juvenile ataxia with oculomotor apraxia type 2 (AOA2) and juvenile form of amyotrophic lateral sclerosis (ALS4). In ALS4 cells, SETX are mutated to have more helicase function, resulting in lower R-loop levels then usual, which causes abnormal TGF-β signaling and causes neuron death. AOA2 cells show senataxin loss of function and abnormally high R-loop levels. Neurological diseases such AOA2 and ALS4 are frequently shown to have abnormal accumulation of protein aggregates and research shows that SETX may have an essential role in autophagy by regulating genes involved in clearing protein aggregates.
