= Chirping =

Chirping may refer to:

- Bird vocalization
- Chirping, the act of signaling with chirps, signals in which the frequency increases / decreases with time
  - Chirping, pulse compression by linear frequency modulation
- Trash-talk in ice hockey

== See also ==
- Chirp (disambiguation)
- Chirplet transform
