= SMARCAL1 =

Protein-coding gene in humans

Identifiers
- Aliases: SMARCAL1, HARP, HHARP, SWI/SNF related, matrix associated, actin dependent regulator of chromatin, subfamily a like 1
- External IDs: OMIM: 606622; MGI: 1859183; GeneCards: SMARCAL1
Available structures
| PDB | Ortholog search: PDBe RCSB |
| PDB | List of PDB id codes 4MQV |

Gene location (Human)
| Chr. | Chromosome 2 (human) |
| Band | 2q35 | Start | 216,412,414 bp |
| Band | 2q35 | End | 216,483,053 bp |

Gene location (Mouse)
| Chr. | Chromosome 1 (mouse) |
| Band | 1 C3|1 36.72 cM | Start | 72,622,410 bp |
| Band | 1 C3|1 36.72 cM | End | 72,672,293 bp |
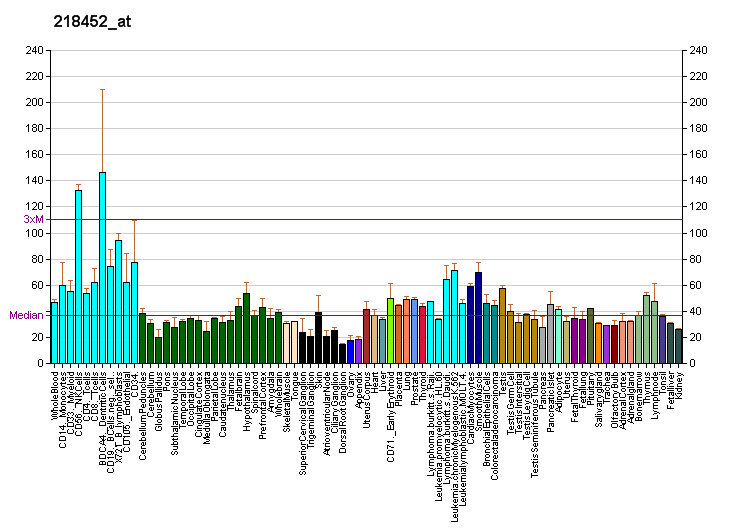
RNA expression pattern
| Bgee | Human / Mouse (ortholog); Top expressed in: gonad; stromal cell of endometrium; sural nerve; ventricular zone; granulocyte; ganglionic eminence; testicle; right adrenal cortex; apex of heart; islet of Langerhans / Top expressed in: primary oocyte; zygote; genital tubercle; secondary oocyte; tail of embryo; neural layer of retina; superior frontal gyrus; otic vesicle; dentate gyrus of hippocampal formation granule cell; ventricular zone; More reference expression data |
| BioGPS | More reference expression data |
Gene ontology
| Molecular function | nucleotide binding; ATP-dependent activity, acting on DNA; protein binding; hydrolase activity; ATP binding; helicase activity; ATP-dependent DNA/DNA annealing activity |
| Cellular component | site of double-strand break; DNA replication factor A complex; nucleus; nucleoplasm; nuclear replication fork |
| Biological process | regulation of transcription by RNA polymerase II; DNA metabolic process; cellular response to DNA damage stimulus; t-circle formation; DNA repair; replication fork processing; DNA rewinding; replication fork protection |
Sources:Amigo / QuickGO
Orthologs
| Databases | NCBI: entry; OMA: entry |
| Species | Human | Mouse |
| Entrez | 50485 | 54380 |
| Ensembl | ENSG00000138375 | ENSMUSG00000039354 |
| UniProt | Q9NZC9 | Q8BJL0 |
| RefSeq (mRNA) | NM_001127207; NM_014140 | NM_018817 |
| RefSeq (protein) | NP_001120679; NP_054859 | NP_061287 |
| Location (UCSC) | Chr 2: 216.41 – 216.48 Mb | Chr 1: 72.62 – 72.67 Mb |
| PubMed search |
- Wikidata
| View/Edit Human | View/Edit Mouse |

SWI/SNF-related matrix-associated actin-dependent regulator of chromatin subfamily A-like protein 1 is a protein that in humans is encoded by the SMARCAL1 gene.

== Function ==
The protein encoded by this gene is a member of the SWI/SNF family of proteins. Members of this family have helicase and ATPase activities and are thought to regulate transcription of certain genes by altering the chromatin structure around those genes. The SMARCAL1 protein convert RPA-bound, single stranded DNA into double-stranded DNA, an enzyme activity termed "annealing helicase". This activity is important for two cellular functions: replication fork reversal, and R-loop unwinding.

The encoded protein shows sequence similarity to the E. coli RNA polymerase-binding protein HepA. Mutations in this gene are a cause of Schimke immunoosseous dysplasia (SIOD), an autosomal recessive disorder with the diagnostic features of spondyloepiphyseal dysplasia, renal dysfunction, and T-cell immunodeficiency.
