= Chirp (company) =

Chirp (also known as Asio Limited) was a technology company based in the UK. Chirp was originally a research project from UCL and was incorporated as a UK limited company in 2012. Chirp specialised in data-over-sound software development kits, which converted data into audio signals that could be transmitted to other devices within hearing range.

Chirp worked on projects with EDF Energy, Activision Blizzard for the game Skylanders: Imaginators and Creata on toys for the Netflix series Beat Bugs.

On 13 February 2020, Chirp announced that it had been acquired by Sonos. Its SDKs were no longer available for download after 1 March 2020.
