= Exodeoxyribonuclease (lambda-induced) =

Identifiers
- EC no.: 3.1.11.3
- CAS no.: 37367-70-7

Databases
- IntEnz: IntEnz view
- BRENDA: BRENDA entry
- ExPASy: NiceZyme view
- KEGG: KEGG entry
- MetaCyc: metabolic pathway
- PRIAM: profile
- PDB structures: RCSB PDB PDBe PDBsum
Search
- PMC: articles
- PubMed: articles
- NCBI: proteins

Exodeoxyribonuclease (lambda-induced) (EC 3.1.11.3, lambda exonuclease, phage lambda-induced exonuclease, Escherichia coli exonuclease IV, E. coli exonuclease IV, exodeoxyribonuclease IV, exonuclease IV) is an exonuclease. This enzyme catalyses the following chemical reaction

Exonucleolytic cleavage in the 5′- to 3′-direction to yield nucleoside 5′-phosphates

This enzyme has preference for double-stranded DNA (dsDNA). This means that it degrades a single strand of dsDNA, primarily any strand which has a phosphate at its 5' end.
