= NTERA-2 =

NTERA-2 cells before (left) and after (right) differentiation induced by exposure to retinoic acid. The bottom panels show NTERA-2 cells expressing GFAP, a neural precursor marker, after differentiation.

The NTERA-2 (also designated NTERA2/D1, NTERA2, or NT2) cell line is a clonally derived, pluripotent human embryonal carcinoma cell line.

== Characteristics ==
NTERA-2 cells exhibit biochemical and developmental properties similar to the cells of the early embryo, and can be used to study the early stages of human neurogenesis. The cells exhibit a high nucleo-cytoplasmic ratio, prominent nucleoli, and the expression of the glycolipid antigen SSEA-3. They also express nestin and vimentin, which are found in neuroepithelial precursor cells, as well as microtubule-associated proteins expressed in human neuroepithelium. NTERA-2 cells also accumulate cytoplasmic glycogen.

== Differentiation ==
NTERA-2 cells differentiate when exposed to retinoic acid and lose expression of SSEA-3. Differentiation produces neurons via asymmetric cell division, and these cells form interconnected axon networks and express tetanus toxin receptors and neurofilament proteins. By 10–14 days of exposure to retinoic acid, NTERA-2 cells begin to take on the morphological characteristics of neurons, such as rounded cell bodies and processes. NTERA-2 cells can also produce a small number of oligodendrocyte-type cells, but they cannot differentiate into astrocytes.

== Research ==
Because of their similarity to human embryonic stem cells, NTERA-2 cells are used to study the dopaminergic differentiation of neuronal precursor cells. They have also been proposed as an in vitro test system for developmental neurotoxicity.

== History ==
NTERA-2 cells were originally isolated from a lung metastasis from a 22-year-old male patient with primary embryonal carcinoma of the testis. The tumor was xenografted onto a mouse, and from this cells were cloned into the NTERA-2 cell line.
