= Lattice model (biophysics) =

Class of statistical-mechanical model

Lattice models in biophysics represent a class of statistical-mechanical models which consider a biological macromacromolecule (such as DNA, protein, actin, etc.) as a lattice of units, each unit being in different states or conformations.

For example, DNA in chromatin can be represented as a one-dimensional lattice, whose elementary units are the nucleotide, base pair or nucleosome. Different states of the unit can be realized either by chemical modifications (e.g. DNA methylation or modifications of DNA-bound histones), or due to quantized internal degrees of freedom (e.g. different angles of the bond joining two neighboring units), or due to binding events involving a given unit (e.g. reversible binding of small ligands or proteins to DNA, or binding/unbinding of two complementary nucleotides in the DNA base pair).
