= TCP-seq =

Translation complex profile sequencing (TCP-seq) is a molecular biology method for obtaining snapshots of momentary distribution of protein synthesis complexes along messenger RNA (mRNA) chains.

== Application ==
Expression of genetic code in all life forms consists of two major processes, synthesis of copies of the genetic code recorded in DNA into the form of mRNA (transcription), and protein synthesis itself (translation), whereby the code copies in mRNA are decoded into amino acid sequences of the respective proteins. Both transcription and translation are highly regulated processes essentially controlling everything of what happens in live cells (and multicellular organisms, consequently).

Control of translation is especially important in eukaryotic cells where it forms part of post-transcriptional regulatory networks of genes expression. This additional functionality is reflected in the increased complexity of the translation process, making it a hard object to investigate. Yet details on when and what mRNA is translated and what mechanisms are responsible for this control are key to understanding of normal and pathological cell functionality. TCP-seq can be used to obtain this information.

== Principles ==
With the advent of the high-throughput DNA and RNA sequence identification methods (such as Illumina sequencing), it became possible to efficiently analyse nucleotide sequences of large numbers of relatively short DNA and RNA fragments. Sequences of these fragments can be superimposed to reconstruct the source. Alternatively, if the source sequence is already known, the fragments can be found within it (“mapped”), and their individual numbers counted. Thus, if an initial stage exists whereby the fragments are differentially present or selected (“enriched”), this approach can be used to quantitatively describe such stage over even a very large number or length of the input sequences, most usually encompassing the entire DNA or RNA of the cell.

TCP-seq is based on these capabilities of the high-throughput RNA sequencing and further uses the nucleic acid protection phenomenon. The protection is manifested as resistance to depolymerisation or modification of stretches of nucleic acids (particularly, RNA) that are tightly bound to or engulfed with other biomolecules, which thus leave their “footprints” over the nucleic acid strand. These “footprint” fragments therefore represent location on nucleic acid chain where the interaction occurs. By sequencing and mapping the fragments back to the source sequence, it is possible to precisely identify the locations and counts of these intermolecular contacts.

In case of TCP-seq, ribosomes and ribosomal subunits engaged in interaction with mRNA are first fast chemically crosslinked to it with formaldehyde to preserve existing state of interactions (“snapshot” of distribution) and to block any possible non-equilibrium processes. The crosslinking can be performed directly in, but not restricted to, live cells. The RNA is then partially degraded (e.g. with ribonuclease) so that only fragments protected by the ribosomes or ribosomal subunits are left. The protected fragments are then purified according to the sedimentation dynamics of the attached ribosomes or ribosomal subunits, de-blocked, sequenced and mapped to the source transcriptome, giving the original locations of the translation complexes over mRNA.

TCP-seq merges several elements typical to other transcriptome-wide analyses of its kind. In particular, polysome profiling and ribosome (translation) profiling approaches are also employed to identify mRNA involved in polysome formation and locations of elongating ribosomes over coding regions of transcripts, correspondingly. These methods, however, do not use chemical stabilisation of translation complexes and purification of the covalently bound intermediates from the live cells. TCP-seq thus can be considered more as a functional equivalent of ChIP-seq and similar methods of investigating momentary interactions of DNA that are redesigned to be applicable for translation.

== Advantages and disadvantages ==
The advantages of the method include:

- uniquely wide field of view (because translation complexes of any type, including scanning small ribosomal subunits, are captured for the first time);
- potentially more natural representation of complex dynamics (because all, and not only selected, translation processes are arrested by formaldehyde fixation);
- possibly more faithful and/or sensitive detection of translation complexes locations (as covalent fixation prevents detachment of the fragments from the ribosomes or their subunits).

The disadvantages include:

- higher overall complexity of the experimental procedure (due to requirement of the initial isolation of translated mRNA and preparative sedimentation to separate ribosomes and ribosomal subunits);
- higher contamination of the useful sequencing read depth with the undesired fragments of the ribosomal RNA (inherited from the wide size selection window used for protected RNA fragments);
- a pre-requirement for optimization of the formaldehyde fixation procedure for each new cell or sample type (as optimal formaldehyde fixation timings strongly depend on sample morphology and both over- and under-fixation will compromise the results).

== Development ==
The method is currently being developed and was applied to investigate translation dynamics in live yeast cells and is extending, rather than simply combining, the capabilities of the previous techniques. The only other transcriptome-wide method for mapping ribosome positions over mRNA with nucleotide precision is ribosome (translation) profiling. However, it captures positions of only elongating ribosomes, and most dynamic and functionally important intermediates of translation at the initiation stage are not detected.

TCP-seq was designed to specifically target these blind spots. It can essentially provide the same level of details for elongation phase as ribosome (translation) profiling, but also includes recording of initiation, termination and recycling intermediates (and basically any other possible translation complexes as long as the ribosome or its subunits are contacting and protecting the mRNA) of protein synthesis that previously remained out of the reach. Therefore, TCP-seq provides a single approach for a complete insight into the translation process of a biological sample. This particular aspect of the method can be expected to be developed further as the dynamics of ribosomal scanning on mRNA during translation initiation is generally unknown for the most of life. Current dataset containing TCP-seq data for translation initiation is available for yeast Saccharomyces cerevisiae, and likely to be extended for other organisms in the future.
