= Competition-ChIP =

Competition-ChIP is variant of the ChIP sequencing protocol, used to measure relative binding dynamics of a transcription factor (TF) on DNA. Since TF occupancy measures are thought to be a poor predictor of TF function at a given locus, Competition-ChIP is much more strongly linked to function than occupancy. The technique was originally developed in Jason D. Lieb's Lab in 2011.
