= R-loop =

Three-stranded nucleic acid structure

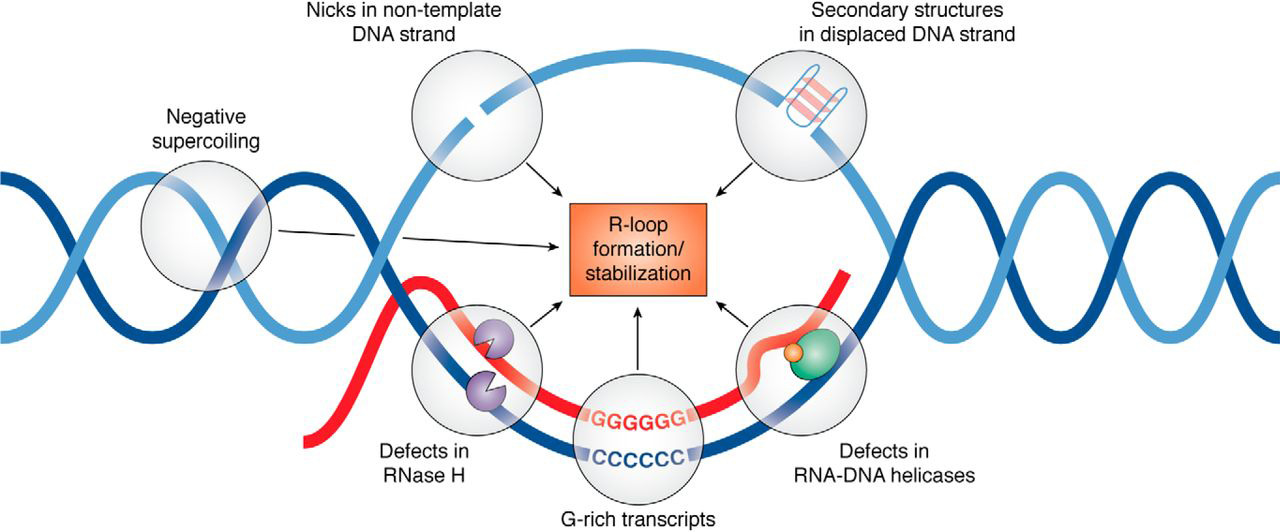
Schematic representation of factors promoting R-loop formation and stabilization

An R-loop is a three-stranded nucleic acid structure, composed of a DNA:RNA hybrid and the associated non-template single-stranded DNA. R-loops may be formed in a variety of circumstances. They may be tolerated or cleared by cellular components. The name reflects the similarity of these structures to D-loops; the "R" in this case represents the involvement of an RNA moiety.

In the laboratory, R-loops can be created by transcription of DNA sequences (for example those that have a high GC content) that favor RNA annealing behind the progressing RNA polymerase. At least 100 base pairs (bp) of DNA:RNA hybrid is required to form a stable R-loop. R-loops may be created by hybridization of mature mRNA with double-stranded DNA under conditions favoring the formation of a DNA-RNA hybrid; in this case, the intron regions (spliced out of the mRNA) form single-stranded DNA loops, as they cannot hybridize with complementary mRNA sequences.

== History ==
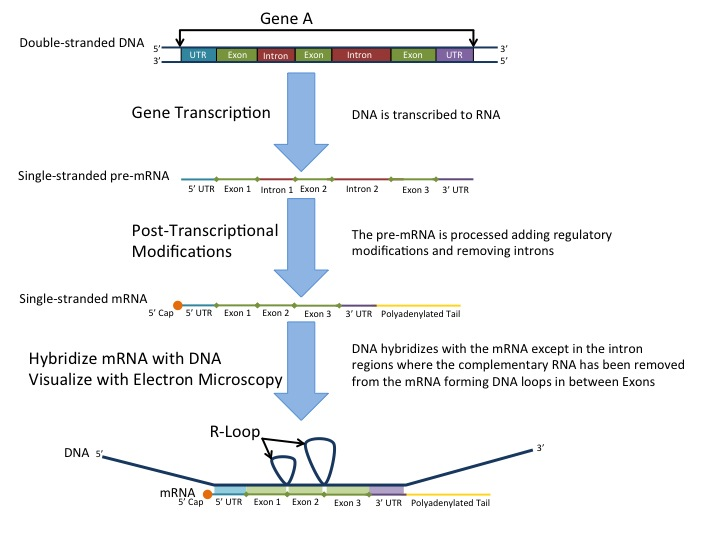
An illustration showing how a DNA-mRNA hybrid forms R-Loops in the regions where introns have been removed through splicing exons.

R-looping was described in 1976. Independent R-loop studies from Richard J. Roberts and Phillip A. Sharp reported that protein-coding adenovirus genes contained DNA sequences that were not present in the mature mRNA. Roberts and Sharp were awarded the Nobel Prize in 1993 for independently discovering introns. After their discovery in adenovirus, introns were found in eukaryotic genes such as the ovalbumin gene (by O'Malley, confirmed by other groups), hexon DNA, and extrachromosomal rRNA genes of Tetrahymena thermophila.

In the mid-1980s, development of an antibody that binds specifically to the R-loop structure opened the door for immunofluorescence studies, as well as genome-wide characterization of R-loop formation by DRIP-seq.

== Mapping ==
R-loop mapping is a laboratory technique used to distinguish introns from exons in double-stranded DNA. These R-loops are visualized by electron microscopy and reveal intron regions of DNA by creating unbound loops at these regions.

== In vivo ==
The potential for R-loops to serve as replication primers was demonstrated in 1980. In 1994, R-loops were demonstrated to be present in vivo through analysis of plasmids isolated from E. coli mutants carrying mutations in topoisomerase. This discovery of endogenous R-loops, in conjunction with rapid advances in genetic sequencing technologies, inspired R-loop research in the early 2000s.

=== Regulation of R-loop formation and resolution ===
More than 50 proteins appear to influence R-loop accumulation. While many are believed to contribute by sequestering or processing newly transcribed RNA to prevent re-annealing to the template, mechanisms of R-loop interaction for many of these proteins remain to be determined.

Three main classes of enzyme can remove RNA that becomes trapped in the duplex within an R-loop. RNaseH enzymes are the primary proteins responsible for dissolving R-loops, acting to degrade the RNA moiety to allow the two complementary DNA strands to anneal. Alternatively, helicases act to unwind the RNA:DNA duplex so that RNA is released. Senataxin is one helicase that can move along ssRNA, and appears to be necessary for preventing R-loop formation at transcription pause sites. In addition Senataxin is up-regulated by hypoxia to prevent R-loop-induced DNA damage.The third are branchpoint translocases such as FANCM, SMARCAL1 and ZRANB3 in humans or RecG in bacteria. Branchpoint translocases act on the double-stranded DNA adjacent to the DNA:RNA hybrid. By pushing at the branchpoint, they act to "zip" the DNA and expel the trapped RNA. This makes branchpoint translocases efficient at removing both RNA and proteins that are bound to the R-loop. Branchpoint translocases may work together with RNaseH and helicases on some types of R-loops that occur at challenging structures.

=== Gene regulation ===
R-loop formation is a key step in immunoglobulin class switching, a process that allows activated B cells to modulate antibody production. They appear to play a role in protecting some active promoters from methylation. R-loops can inhibit transcription. R-loop formation appears to be associated with "open" chromatin, characteristic of actively transcribed regions.

=== Genetic damage ===
When unscheduled R-loops form, they can cause damage. Exposed ssDNA can come under attack by endogenous mutagens, including DNA-modifying enzymes such as activation-induced cytidine deaminase, and can block replication forks to induce fork collapse and subsequent double-strand breaks. R-loops may also induce unscheduled replication by acting as a primer.

R-loop accumulation is associated with disease, including amyotrophic lateral sclerosis type 4 (ALS4), ataxia oculomotor apraxia type 2 (AOA2), Aicardi–Goutières syndrome, Angelman syndrome, Prader–Willi syndrome, and cancer. Genes associated with Fanconi anemia also seem to be important for the maintenance of genome stability under conditions where R-loops accumulate.

=== Inflammaging ===
Nuclear-derived cytoplasmic R-loops promote senescence-associated secretory phenotype (SASP) and inflammaging. Nuclear-derived R-loops accumulate in the cytoplasm of senescent cells along with alpha-satellite repeat enrichment. These cytoplasmic R-loops localize into cytoplasmic chromatin fragments (CCFs) and activate the cGAS–STING innate immune pathway to drive SASP. The exportin-1 (XPO1)–DEAD-Box helicase 1 (DDX1) complex is essential for nuclear R-loop export and their subsequent localization into CCFs. Inhibition of XPO1 with KPT-330 suppresses nuclear R-loop export and its localization into CCFs, attenuates SASP, mitigates inflammation and extends healthspan.

== Introns and DNA damage ==
Introns are non-coding regions within genes that are transcribed along with gene coding regions, but are subsequently removed from the primary RNA transcript by splicing. Actively transcribed regions of DNA often form R-loops that are vulnerable to DNA damage. Introns reduce R-loop formation and DNA damage in highly expressed yeast genes. Genome-wide analysis showed that intron-containing genes display decreased R-loop levels and decreased DNA damage compared to intron-less genes of similar expression in both yeast and humans. Inserting an intron within an R-loop-prone gene can suppress R-loop formation and recombination. Bonnet et al. (2017) speculated that the function of introns in maintaining genetic stability may explain their evolutionary maintenance at certain locations, particularly in highly expressed genes.

== See also ==
- DRIP-seq
- Ribonuclease H
- Immunoglobulin class switching
- DNA replication
