= Sono-Seq =

Sono-Seq (Sonication of Cross-linked Chromatin Sequencing) is a method in molecular biology used for determining the sequences of those DNA regions in the genome near regions of open chromatin of expressed genes. It is also known as "Input" in the Chip-Seq protocol, since it follows the same steps except it doesn't require immunoprecipitation.
