= ChiRP-Seq =

DNA sequencing method

ChiRP-Seq (Chromatin Isolation by RNA purification) is a high-throughput sequencing method to discover regions of the genome which are bound by a specific RNA (or by a ribonucleoprotein containing the RNA of interest). Recent studies have shown that a significant proportion of some genomes (including mouse and human genomes) synthesize RNA that apparently do not code for proteins. The function of most of these non-coding RNA still has to be ascertained. Various genomic methods are being developed to map the functional association of these novel RNA to distinct regions of the genome to gain a better understanding of their function. ChiRP-Seq is one of these new methods which uses the massively parallel sequencing capability of 2nd generation sequencers to catalog the binding sites of these novel RNA molecules on a genome.

Although many have believed that RNAs mainly encode for proteins, a very large portion of the eukaryotic genome is composed of RNAs that do not. These RNAs were originally considered junk until new advancements lead to the realization that they may indeed have a biological purpose. Over the last few years lncRNAs have been the least explored and functionally characterized emerging regulatory molecules, especially in comparison to their short counterparts, small ncRNAs. ChiRP-Seq is a new technique that has allowed researchers to map long RNA occupancy across the genome at a higher resolution than ever before. ChiRP-Seq works via affinity capture of a target complex of lncRNA and chromatin by tiling antisense-oligos. This technique will allow scientists to generate a map of genomic binding sites of several hundred bases very accurately due to high sensitivity and low background.

== Overview of method ==
Tens of oligonucleotide probes are designed to be complementary to the RNA of interest. These oligos are labeled with biotin. Cells are cross-linked by UV or formalin and nuclei are isolated from these treated cells. The isolated nuclei are lysed and the released chromatin is fragmented by sonication to produce approximately 100-500 bp sized fragments. These chromatin fragments are hybridized to the biotinylated probe set. Complexes containing biotin-probe + RNA of interest + DNA fragment are captured by magnetic beads labeled with streptavidin.

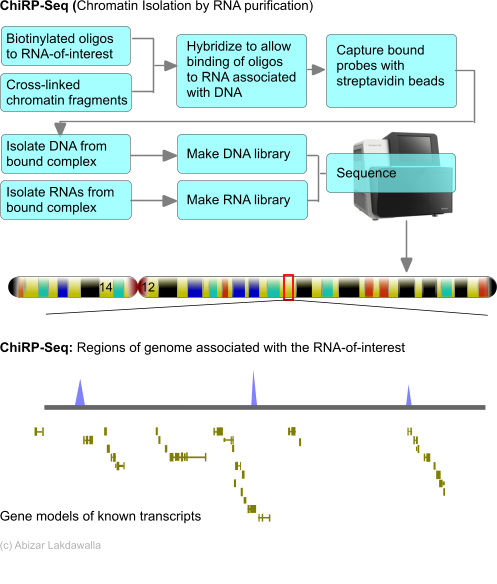
Overview of a next generation sequencing method to characterize RNA binding sites to chromatin. Chromatin isolation by RNA purification.

DNA is isolated from an aliquot of the bound complex by treatment with RNAse (or proteinase followed by RNAse) to digest associated protein and RNA. RNA may also be isolated from an additional aliquot of the bound complex to detect other RNA molecules associated with the RNA of interest. The purified DNA is then used to prepare a sequencing library and the library is sequenced on a next generation DNA sequencing system. The sequencing reads are then mapped to the genome. A pile-up of reads at specific locations on the genome indicates that the RNA of interest had bound to that region of the genome. This helps delineate specific genomic regions that interact with RNA. For example, genomic targets of enhancer RNA which act at a distance from their site of synthesis can be easily evaluated by ChiRP-Seq.
