= MIPOL1 =

Protein-coding gene in the species Homo sapiens

Identifiers
- Aliases: MIPOL1, CCDC193, mirror-image polydactyly 1
- External IDs: OMIM: 606850; MGI: 1920740; HomoloGene: 16340; GeneCards: MIPOL1; OMA:MIPOL1 - orthologs

Gene location (Human)
Chr.	Chromosome 14 (human)
Band	14q13.3-q21.1	Start	37,197,913 bp
Band	14q13.3-q21.1	End	37,552,361 bp

Gene location (Mouse)
Chr.	Chromosome 12 (mouse)
Band	12 C1|12 24.7 cM	Start	57,277,213 bp
Band	12 C1|12 24.7 cM	End	57,543,985 bp
RNA expression pattern
Bgee	Human / Mouse (ortholog); Top expressed in: Achilles tendon; testicle; sural nerve; epithelium of colon; left testis; gonad; right testis; popliteal artery; tibial arteries; ventricular zone / Top expressed in: lumbar spinal ganglion; genital tubercle; tail of embryo; lumbar subsegment of spinal cord; transitional epithelium of urinary bladder; spermatid; zygote; embryo; ventricular zone; embryo; More reference expression data
BioGPS	n/a
Orthologs
Species	Human	Mouse
Entrez	145282	73490
Ensembl	ENSG00000151338	ENSMUSG00000047022
UniProt	Q8TD10; Q4G0U7	Q9D9F8
RefSeq (mRNA)	NM_001195296; NM_001195297; NM_138731; NM_001388067; NM_001388068 NM_001388069; NM_001388070; NM_001388071; NM_001388072; NM_001388073; NM_001388074; NM_001388075; NM_001388077	NM_001164370
RefSeq (protein)	NP_001182225; NP_001182226; NP_620059; NP_001182226.1; NP_620059.1	n/a
Location (UCSC)	Chr 14: 37.2 – 37.55 Mb	Chr 12: 57.28 – 57.54 Mb
PubMed search
- Wikidata
View/Edit Human	View/Edit Mouse

MIPOL1 (Mirror Image Polydactyly 1), also known as CCDC193 (Coiled-coil domain containing 193), is a protein that in humans is encoded by the MIPOL1 gene. Mutation of this gene is associated with mirror-image polydactyly (also known as Laurin-Sandrow syndrome.) in humans, which is a rare genetic condition characterized by mirror-image duplication of digits.

== Gene ==
MIPOL1 is also known as CCDC193 (Coiled-coil domain containing 193).

Chromosome 14 diagram with MIPOL1 gene locus marked in red

=== Locus ===
The MIPOL1 gene is located at 14q13.3-q21.1 on the plus strand, spanning base pairs 37,197,888 to 37,579,207 (in the human GRCh38 primary assembly, length: 381,320 base pairs), consisting of 15 exons and 11 introns. Some notable genes in its neighborhood include SLC25A21 (mutation of this gene causes synpolydactyly) and FOXA1.

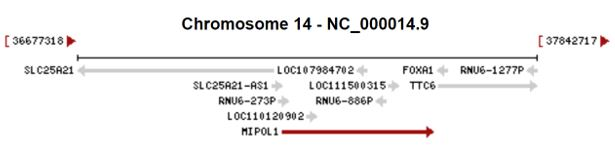
Gene neighborhood of MIPOL1

== mRNA ==
MIPOL1 has at least 15 known splice isoforms produced by alternative splicing.

== Protein ==
=== Properties ===
The unmodified MIPOL1 protein isoform 1 in humans has an isoelectric point of 5.6 and molecular weight 51.5 kDa. Relative to other human proteins, MIPOL1 consists of unusually low amounts of Proline and Glycine and higher amounts of Glutamic acid and Glutamine.

=== Isoforms ===
There are at least three known isoforms of this protein in humans produced by alternative splicing: isoform 1, of length 442 amino acids, isoform 2 of length 261 amino acids and isoform 3 of length 169 amino acids.

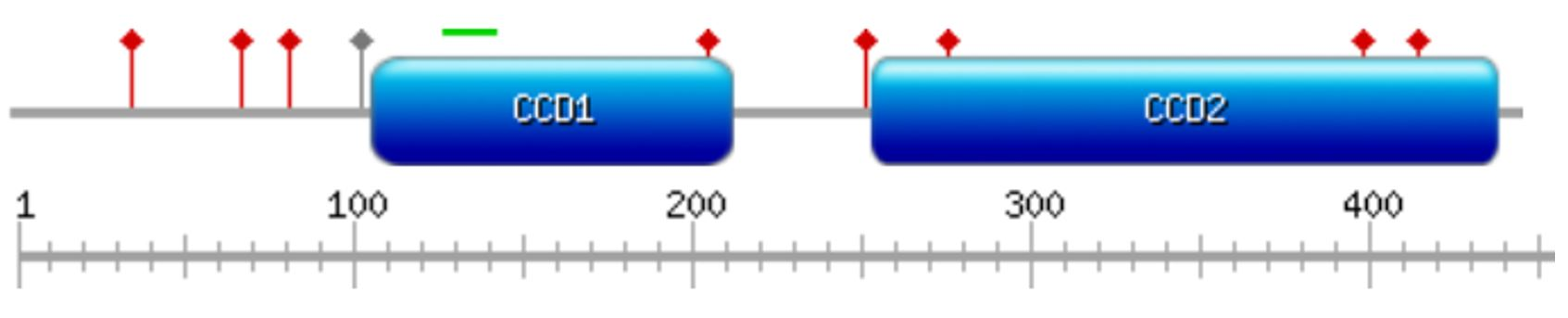
Fig.1. MIPOL1 domain diagram generated using Prosite MyDomains. The two coiled-coil domains are highlighted in blue. The green line indicates the Nuclear localization signal. Some important phosphorylation sites have been highlighted in red. Studies have shown that phosphorylation is an important modification for controlling nucleus-cytoplasm shuttling, and may therefore play an important role in sub-cellular localization of this protein (by modifying the NLS or NES) O-GlcNACylation site has been highlighted in grey.

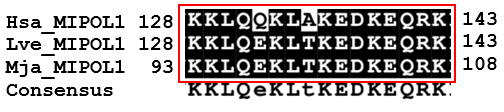
Fig.2.Multiple Sequence Alignment of MIPOL1 Orthologs showing conservation of Bipartite Nuclear Localization Signal in Mammalian orthologs (Hsa is human, Lve is Lipotes vexillifer (dolphin), and Mja is Manis javanica (Pangolin)

=== Domains and motifs ===
MIPOL1 contains two coiled-coil domains in its C-terminus at positions 107 – 212 and 253 – 435 (shown in Fig.1). A bipartite nuclear localization signal is predicted at position 128 – 143.

Fig.3. Annotated conceptual translation of MIPOL1 isoform 1 showing the most important features. The underlined parts represent the coiled-coil domains. Bolded amino acids are highly conserved even in orthologs as distant as Cnidarians. Other bracketed regions show conserved protein family regions identified such as COG1196 and COG 4372. Exon boundaries are highlighted in blue. Bipartite nuclear localization signal is highlighted in blue. Parts of the protein absent in other isoforms have been highlighted.

=== Post-translational modifications ===
The following post-translational modifications are predicted using bioinformatics tools for MIPOL1. Multiple phosphorylation sites are predicted for this protein, that are conserved in close orthologs, including a Casein kinase 1 (CK1) site, three Casein kinase 2 (CK2) sites, and three NEK2 sites.

Table 1: Prediction of potential Post-translational modification sites in Human MIPOL1 using Bioinformatics tools
Post-translational modification	Amino acid site	Prediction tool
Phosphorylation	Ser (37, 42, 69, 75, 105, 126, 205, 275, 344, 350, 364, 412), Thr (80, 251, 259, 338, 365, 396, 435, 437, 440), Tyr (77, 83)	MyHits, NetPhos
O-linked glycosylation	Ser (34, 105, 294, 344, 412), Thr (155, 293)	NetOGlyc
O-GlcNAcylation	Thr (104)	YinOYang
Glycation	Lys (6, 41, 133, 207, 347, 421)	NetGlycate
SUMOylation	Lys (136, 147)	GPS-SUMO
Ubiquitination	Lys (22, 47, 133, 162, 314, 418)	BDM-PUB

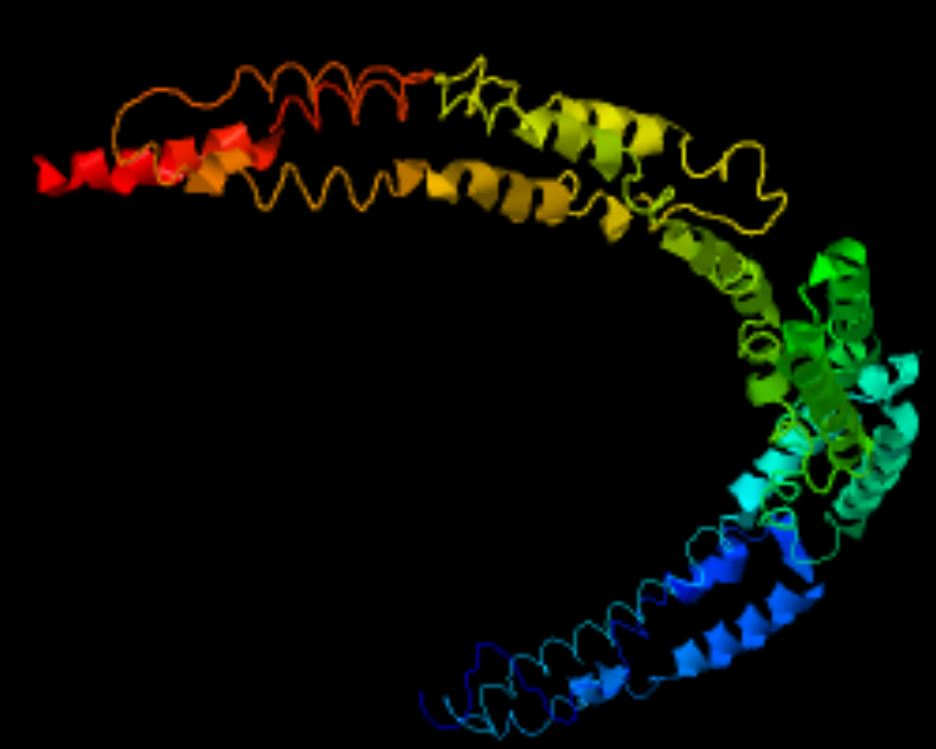
Fig.4.Tertiary structure of MIPOL1 generated using I-TASSER: Blue represents the N-terminus, Red represents the C-terminus

=== Structure ===
The exact structure of the MIPOL1 has not yet been characterized. Homology-based and de novo predictions of its tertiary structure suggest that it may consist of inter-twined alpha helices, forming coiled-coil domains (see Fig.4.).

=== Sub-cellular localization ===
Immunofluorescence imaging in the human U2OS cell line (bone Osteosarcoma epithelial cells) shows localization in the cytosol. Immunohistochemistry imaging of human prostate tissue also suggests cytosolic localization. A bipartite nuclear localization signal is predicted at position 128 – 143, which is highly conserved in mammalian orthologs (see Fig.2.), indicating possible localization in the nucleus.

== Gene regulation ==
The predicted promoter sequence for this gene spans from base pair 37196852 to 37198126 (1,275 bp) and has multiple predicted binding sites for transcription factors such as GATA binding factors, SMAD3, TP63 and NRF1.

== Gene Expression ==
MIPOL1 is ubiquitously expressed at low levels in humans, with highest expression in the prostate.

== Transcript regulation ==
The RNA secondary structure is stabilized by multiple stem loops that have been predicted (using bioinformatics tools), and conserved across closely related species. Multiple binding targets are found for microRNAs such as MIR3163 and MIR190a, that could silence these regions on the mRNA and inhibit translation.

== Clinical significance ==
The MIPOL1 gene is an autosomal dominant gene. It is one of six genes in humans causing non-syndromic polydactyly (i.e. polydactyly occurring as a separate event with no other associated anomalies). Mutation of this gene is associated with mirror-image polydactyly (also known as Laurin-Sandrow syndrome) in humans, which is a rare genetic condition characterized by mirror-image duplication of digits in hands and feet.

This gene has also been associated with central nervous system development, and the loss of this gene can cause craniofacial defects and agenesis of the corpus callosum.

The gene is shown to function as a tumor suppressor in nasopharyngeal carcinoma (NPC), through the up-regulation of the p21 (WAF1/CIP1) and p27 (proteins that are both cyclin-dependent kinases that are linked with tumor suppression via cell cycle arrest) pathways. Another study investigating the role of MIPOL1 gene in cancer progression reported that MIPOL1 was downregulated in NPC tumor tissues, and that artificially re-expressing the gene caused tumor suppression by down-regulating angiogenic factors and reducing the phosphorylation of metastasis associated proteins like AKT, p65 and FAK14. MIPOL1 interacts with another well-known tumor-suppressing gene, RhoB and this interaction was confirmed to enhance RhoB activity.

In a study of pediatric high grade glioma (pHGG), MIPOL1 gene was found to be down-regulated 2.4-fold in the high vascularity tumors

The protein is known to interact with Replicase polyprotein 1ab in SARS-CoV2, which is a protein involved in the transcription and replication of viral RNAs.

=== Interacting proteins ===
This protein is known to interact with multiple human proteins, verified via two-hybrid screening. A few notable examples include:

LATS2: Negatively regulates YAP1 in the Hippo signaling pathway that plays a pivotal role in organ size control and tumor suppression by restricting cell proliferation and promoting apoptosis.

ZGPAT (Zinc finger CCCH-type with G patch domain-containing protein): A transcription repressor that negatively regulates expression of EGFR, a gene involved in cell proliferation, survival and migration, suggesting that it may act as a tumor suppressor.

RCOR3 (REST Corepressor 3): A protein that may act as a component of a co-repressor complex that represses transcription

It also interacts with viral proteins such as:

Replicase polyprotein 1ab (SARS-CoV2): A multifunctional protein involved in the transcription and replication of viral RNAs.

Protein E7 (Human Papillomavirus): Plays a role in viral genome replication by driving entry of quiescent cells into the cell cycle.

== Origin and evolution ==
The earliest known ortholog of this protein appeared around 948 million years ago in Trichoplax adhaerens in phylum Placozoa in kingdom Animalia. The next most distant orthologs appear in phylum Cnidaria, around 824 million years ago.

=== Sequence Homology ===
The MIPOL1 protein has no known paralogs in humans and other species for which orthologs have been found, therefore, it is the only member of its gene family.

There are more than 300 known orthologs of the MIPOL1 protein in Animalia, ranging from primates to corals and sea anemones in phylum Cnidaria. Orthologs of the protein were found in species as distant as Trichoplax adhaerens, a simple primitive invertebrate species. Table 2 shows a sample of the ortholog space.

Closely related orthologs are found in chordates such as mammals, reptiles, birds and amphibians, with sequence similarities greater than 70%. Sequence lengths of orthologs were similar to the human MIPOL1 protein, with no significant gene duplication observed.

Organisms with sequence similarities in the 55-70% range (moderately related orthologs) were found in bony fish, cartilaginous fish and coelacanths. Sequence length is generally longer in these species, with a longer amino acid sequence in the N-terminus (alignment with human protein occurs around amino acid 100).

Distantly related orthologs with similarities less than 50% (around 30 – 40%) are found in hemichordates, echinoderms, arthropods, molluscs, cnidaria and placozoa. Multiple sequence alignment with distant orthologs indicates poor alignment in the N-terminus of the protein.

Two COG (Clusters of Orthologous Groups of proteins) domains were found in this protein (see Fig.3): COG1196 at position 106 - 340 (Chromosome segregation ATPase) and COG4372 at 259 - 431 (uncharacterized conserved protein containing a DUF3084 domain)

Table 2: MIPOL1 Ortholog space
Species	Organism Common Name	NCBI Accession	Date of Divergence from humans (MYA)	Sequence length (AAs)	Sequence identity to human protein (%)
Homo sapiens	Human	NP_001182226.1	0	442	100
Macaca fascicularis	Crab-eating macaque	XP_005561170.1	29.44	442	94.3
Lipotes vexillifer	Yangtze River dolphin	XP_007465863.1	96	442	85.5
Manis javanica	Malayan pangolin	XP_017524645.1	96	407	77.6
Myotis brandtii	Brandt's bat	XP_005865039.1	96	463	74.6
Chelonia mydas	Green sea turtle	XP_007065307.1	312	440	67.9
Notechis scutatus	Mainland tiger snake	XP_026520263.1	312	429	54.0
Gallus gallus	Chicken	XP_004941823.1	312	429	55.9
Rhinatrema bivittatum	Two-lined caecilian	XP_029454767.1	351.8	443	59.3
Latimeria chalumnae	West Indian Ocean coelacanth	XP_005989227.1	413	532	51.9
Danio rerio	Zebrafish	XP_021322786.1	435	381	38.8
Oryzias melastigma	Indian medaka	XP_024129547.1	435	404	30.9
Amblyraja radiata	Thorny skate	XP_032883021.1	473	497	45.8
Saccoglossus kowalevskii	Acorn worm	XP_006815617.1	684	666	23.3
Asterias rubens	Common starfish	XP_033636481.1	684	646	22.2
Limulus polyphemus	Atlantic horseshoe crab	XP_022249371.1	797	579	19.2
Pecten maximus	Great scallop	XP_033734074.1	797	598	22.5
Exaiptasia pallida	Brown anemone	KXJ12639.1	824	468	27.5
Orbicella faveolata	Mountainous star coral	XP_020610356.1	824	453	27.5
Trichoplax adhaerens	Trichoplax	XP_002117892.1	948	553	22.9

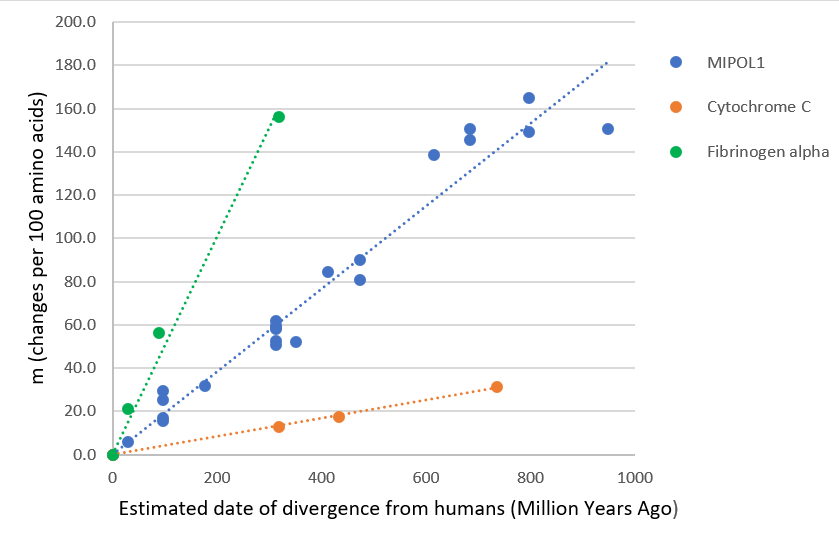
Fig.5. Plot of number of amino acid changes per 100 amino acids as a function of date of divergence for MIPOL1, cytochrome c and Fibrinogen alpha

=== Phylogenetics ===
Using a linear regression analysis on a plot of corrected percent divergence (amino acid changes per 100 amino acids) as a function of date of divergence from humans for different MIPOL1 orthologs (see Fig.5), it is estimated that a 1% change in amino acids in the MIPOL1 protein takes 5.68 million years. MIPOL1 protein is evolving at a moderate rate relative to fast evolving protein such as fibrinogen alpha, and slow evolving proteins such as cytochrome C.
