= MicroRNA and microRNA target database =

This is a compilation of databases, web portals, and servers used for cataloging microRNAs and their targets. MicroRNAs (miRNAs) represent an important class of small non-coding RNAs (ncRNAs) that regulate gene expression by targeting and binding to messenger RNAs (mRNAs). The binding between each microRNA and the selected mRNA occurs within the RNA-induced silencing complex (miRISC) and leads to decreased protein expression through translational repression and/or mRNA degradation. Since target recognition occurs through base pairing, several prediction models have been developed which aim to predict potential mRNA targets based on sequence complementarity and other features These resources must be distinguished from databases that collect observed experimental interactions. Moreover, experimental evidence can be deduced from high-throughput experiments, which collect vast amounts of data but tend to be more error-prone, and low-throughput experiments, in which a single mRNA target or a few targets are tested. Although considerable efforts have been made to standardize annotation vocabulary and RNA identifiers to support data integration and improve clarity for readers, significant discrepancies in annotation criteria still exist across databases, making it difficult for users to determine what constitutes a bona fide interactor . .

== microRNA target gene databases ==
Name	Description	type	Link	References
miRTARGET	miRTARGET is an integrated web tool for the identification of microRNA targets with potential therapeutic or prognostic value in cancer. The target prediction is based on four dataset categories: mRNA profiling in cells or mice after (1) ectopic miRNA expression or (2) miRNA inactivation by knock-out or knock-down, (3) correlation analyses of mRNA and miRNA expression profiles, and (4) ten computational miRNA target prediction algorithms.	web-based software	website	
StarBase	starBase is designed for decoding miRNA-lncRNA, miRNA-mRNA, miRNA-circRNA, miRNA-pseudogene, miRNA-sncRNA, protein-lncRNA, protein-sncRNA, protein-mRNA and protein-pseudogene interactions and ceRNA networks from 108 CLIP-Seq (HITS-CLIP, PAR-CLIP, iCLIP, CLASH) datasets. It also provides Pan-Cancer Analysis for microRNAs, lncRNAs, circRNAs and protein-coding genes from 6000 tumor samples.	database	website	
StarScan	StarScan is developed for scanning small RNA (miRNA, piRNA, siRNA) mediated RNA cleavage events in lncRNA, circRNA, mRNA and pseudo genes from degradome sequencing data.	web-based software	website	
Cupid	Cupid is a method for simultaneous prediction of miRNA-target interactions and their mediated competing endogenous RNA (ceRNA) interactions. It is an integrative approach significantly improves on miRNA-target prediction accuracy as assessed by both mRNA and protein level measurements in breast cancer cell lines. Cupid is implemented in 3 steps: Step 1: re-evaluate candidate miRNA binding sites in 3' UTRs. Step2: interactions are predicted by integrating information about selected sites and the statistical dependency between the expression profiles of miRNA and putative targets. Step 3: Cupid assesses whether inferred targets compete for predicted miRNA regulators. * Only the source code for step 3 is provided.	software (MATLAB)	website	
TargetScan	Predicts biological targets of miRNAs by searching for the presence of sites that match the seed region of each miRNA. In flies and nematodes, predictions are ranked based on the probability of their evolutionary conservation. In zebrafish, predictions are ranked based on site number, site type, and site context, which includes factors that influence target-site accessibility. In mammals, the user can choose whether the predictions should be ranked based on the probability of their conservation or on site number, type, and context. In mammals and nematodes, the user can choose to extend the predictions beyond conserved sites and consider all sites.	database, webserver	website	
TarBase	A comprehensive database of experimentally supported animal microRNA targets	database	website	
Diana-microT	DIANA-microT 3.0 is an algorithm based on several parameters calculated individually for each microRNA and it combines conserved and non-conserved microRNA recognition elements into a final prediction score.	webserver	webserver	
miRecords	an integrated resource for microRNA-target interactions.	database	website	
PicTar	PicTar is Combinatorial microRNA target predictions.	database, webserver, predictions	website	
PITA	PITA, incorporates the role of target-site accessibility, as determined by base-pairing interactions within the mRNA, in microRNA target recognition.	webserver, predictions	predictions	
RepTar	A database of inverse miRNA target predictions, based on the RepTar algorithm that is independent of evolutionary conservation considerations and is not limited to seed pairing sites.	database	website	
RNA22	The first link (predictions) provides RNA22 predictions for all protein coding transcripts in human, mouse, roundworm, and fruit fly. It allows you to visualize the predictions within a cDNA map and also find transcripts where multiple miR's of interest target. The second web-site link (custom) first finds putative microRNA binding sites in the sequence of interest, then identifies the targeted microRNA.	webserver, predictions	predictions custom	
miRTarBase	The experimentally validated microRNA-target interactions database. As a database, miRTarBase has accumulated more than three hundred and sixty thousand miRNA-target interactions (MTIs), which are collected by manually surveying pertinent literature after NLP of the text systematically to filter research articles related to functional studies of miRNAs. Generally, the collected MTIs are validated experimentally by reporter assay, western blot, microarray and next-generation sequencing experiments. While containing the largest amount of validated MTIs, the miRTarBase provides the most updated collection by comparing with other similar, previously developed databases.	database	website	
miRwalk	Aggregates and compare results from other miRNA-to-mRNA databases	database, webserver		
MBSTAR	Multiple Instance approach for finding out true or functional microRNA binding sites.	webserver, predictions	predictions	
.

== microRNA databases ==
Name	Description	type	Link	References
miRBase	miRBase database is the most used database of published miRNA sequences and annotation.	database	website	
RNAcentral	RNAcentral is a centralised database of non‐coding RNA sequences collated from expert non‐coding RNA databases, model organism databases and sequence accession databases. It provides a unique access point for more than 40 repositories and unique identifiers to ncRNA molecules, to facilitate data integration	database	website	
deepBase	deepBase is a database for annotating and discovering small and long ncRNAs (microRNAs, siRNAs, piRNAs...) from high-throughput deep sequencing data.	database	website	
microRNA.org	microRNA.org is a database for Experimentally observed microRNA expression patterns and predicted microRNA targets & target downregulation scores.	database	website	
miRGen 4.0	DIANA-miRGen v4: indexing promoters and regulators for more than 1500 microRNAs	database	website	
MirGeneDB	MirGeneDB is a database of manually curated microRNA genes that have been validated and annotated. MirGeneDB 2.1 includes more than 16,000 microRNA gene entries representing more than 1,500 miRNA families from 75 metazoan species. All microRNAs can be browsed, searched and downloaded.	database	website	
miRNAMap	miRNAMap: genomic maps of microRNA genes and their target genes in mammalian genomes	database	website	
PMRD	PMRD: plant microRNA database	database	website	
TargetScan	TargetScan7.0 classifies microRNAs according to their level of conservation (i.e., species-specific, conserved among mammals, or broadly conserved among vertebrates) and aggregates them into families based upon their seed sequence. It also annotates conserved isomiRs using small RNA sequencing datasets.	database	website	
VIRmiRNA	VIRmiRNA is the first dedicated resource on experimental viral miRNA and their targets. This resource also provides inclusive knowledge about anti-viral miRNAs known to play role in antiviral immunity of host.	Database	website	
