= Reptar (disambiguation) =

Reptar is a Rugrats character.

Reptar may also refer to:

- RepTar (database), a genetic research database
- Reptar (band), an American alternative rock band
- Reptar (vulnerability), an Intel CPU vulnerability discovered in 2023
