= L1TD1 =

Protein found in humans

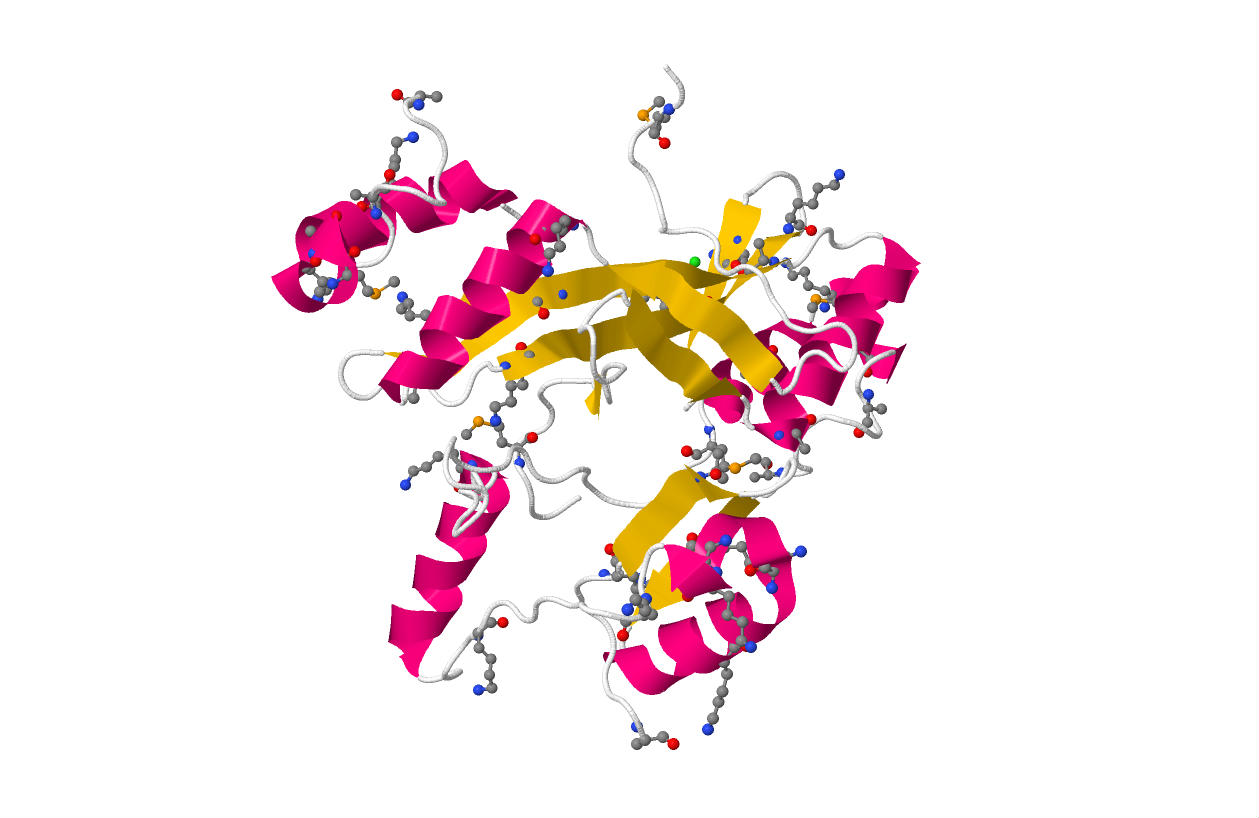

Identifiers
- Aliases: L1TD1, ECAT11, LINE-1 type transposase domain containing 1, LINE1 type transposase domain containing 1
- External IDs: MGI: 3578435; GeneCards: L1TD1
Available structures
| PDB | Ortholog search: PDBe RCSB |
| PDB | List of PDB id codes 2LR6, 3SOO |

Gene location (Human)
| Chr. | Chromosome 1 (human) |
| Band | 1p31.3 | Start | 62,194,849 bp |
| Band | 1p31.3 | End | 62,212,328 bp |

Gene location (Mouse)
| Chr. | Chromosome 4 (mouse) |
| Band | 4|4 C6 | Start | 98,614,971 bp |
| Band | 4|4 C6 | End | 98,626,717 bp |
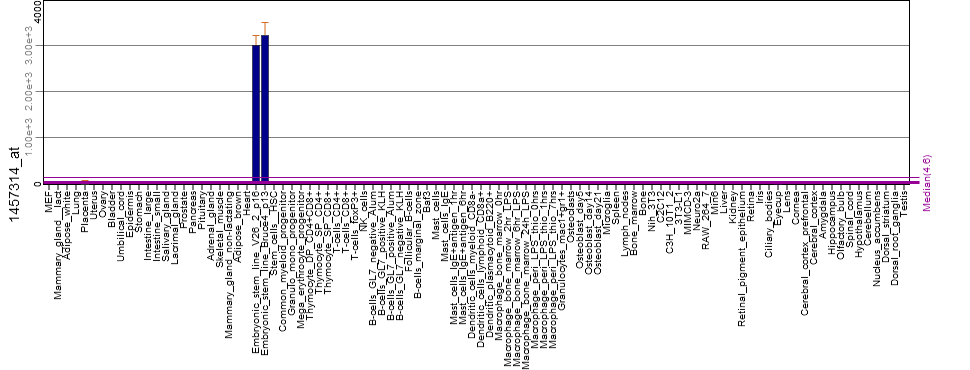

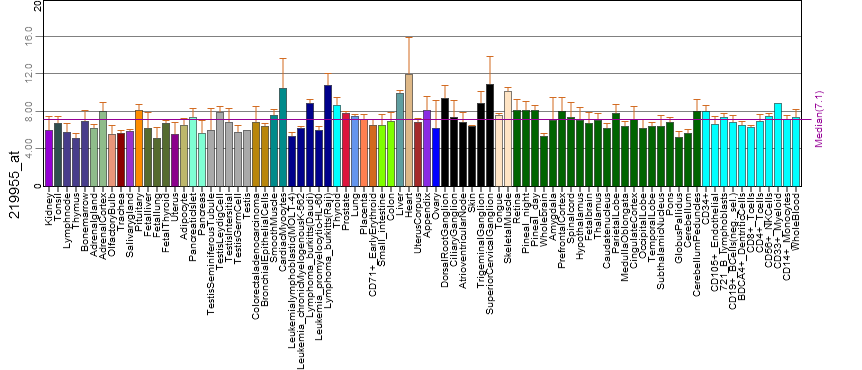
RNA expression pattern
| Bgee | Human / Mouse (ortholog); Top expressed in: gonad; testicle; placenta; appendix; mucosa of transverse colon; white blood cell; monocyte; right testis; left testis; epithelium of colon / Top expressed in: yolk sac; epiblast; embryo; blastocyst; blastocyst; primitive streak; morula; embryo; tail of embryo; hand; More reference expression data |
| BioGPS | More reference expression data |
Gene ontology
| Molecular function | single-stranded RNA binding; protein binding |
| Cellular component | ribonucleoprotein complex |
| Biological process | transposition, RNA-mediated |
Sources:Amigo / QuickGO
Orthologs
| Databases | NCBI: entry; OMA: entry |
| Species | Human | Mouse |
| Entrez | 54596 | 381591 |
| Ensembl | ENSG00000240563 | ENSMUSG00000087166 |
| UniProt | Q5T7N2 | Q587J6 |
| RefSeq (mRNA) | NM_019079; NM_001164835 | NM_001081202 |
| RefSeq (protein) | NP_001158307; NP_061952 | NP_001074671 |
| Location (UCSC) | Chr 1: 62.19 – 62.21 Mb | Chr 4: 98.61 – 98.63 Mb |
| PubMed search |
- Wikidata
| View/Edit Human | View/Edit Mouse |

LINE-1 type transposase domain containing 1, also known as L1TD1, is an RNA-binding protein that involved with self-renewal of undifferentiated human embryonic stem cells and cancer cell proliferation. L1TD1 has been reported to associate with the development of several cancers.
