= Tex36 =

Testis expressed 36, TEX36, is a protein that in humans is encoded by the tex36 gene. TEX36 interacts with proteins involved in the MAP kinase family, supporting that TEX36 may be regulated with on or off configurations. The encoded protein is highly expressed in fetal, testes, and placental tissues and has background expression levels in adults. There are also many motifs specific to male sex determination and spermatogenic factors, suggesting that it is involved in development.

== Gene ==
The verified gene sequence was confirmed in NCBI on November 26, 2016. The coding region spans 106,622 bases, and within that region are 4 exons.

=== Aliases ===
TEX36, is also known by the aliases C10orf122 and BA383C5.1. It has cytogenetic bands at 10q26.13. TEX36 is also a member of the Human CCDS set CCDS44493.1.

=== Locus ===
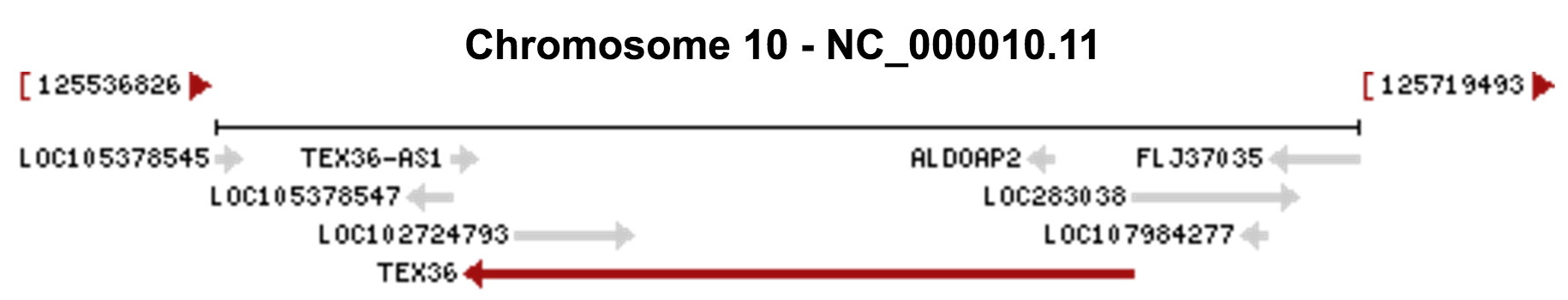
Gene neighborhood of TEX36 from NCBI, gene database. Genes ALDOAP2, or aldolace, fructose-biphosphate A2, and other uncharacterized loci LOC105378547 and LOC107984277 are in the environment of TEX36, located on chromosome 10, open reading frame 22.

The gene spans from 125576522 to 125683144 in the human genome. Figured is the genomic context of TEX36. There is aldolase, fructose-biphosphate A2 along with several uncharacterized loci in the gene neighborhood of TEX36.

== mRNA ==
There are two variants of TEX36, transcripts 1 and 2. The two differ by an alternately spliced 4th exon. Validated variants, 1 and 2, both contain 4 exons, but variant 1 has a longer transcript with 922 base pairs, whereas variant 2 contains 777 base pairs with a different terminating region. Only variant 1 is the protein encoding transcript.

== Protein ==
Variant 1 encodes protein testis expressed 36. TEX36 does not have any confirmed isoforms. The unmodified TEX36 consists of 186 amino acids and has a molecular weight of 21,545 daltons, with an isoelectric point of 9.1. Amino acids serine and lysine are highly represented in the protein at a higher frequency than observed in most proteins in vertebrates.

=== Domains & Motifs ===
Schematic of identified domains and motifs along with post-translational modifications of TEX36. These include amidation sites where there are brackets, the MAPK interacting motif, and HDNR motif. Red flags represent casein kinase phosphorylation sites, pat4 nuclearlization signals with grey flags, and protein kinase c phosphorylation sites with green lines.

Domain	Location	Notes
VVSS	136-139	Repeat
HDNR	73-76	Domain of unknown function, found in 6 human proteins
Pat4	167, 168	Nuclear localization signal
MapK	13-18	MapK interacting docking motif, overlaps with beta strand

=== Secondary Structure ===
Based on conservation through multiple sequence alignments and multiple secondary structure prediction algorithms, TEX36 is composed of 4 alpha helices and 5 beta strands.

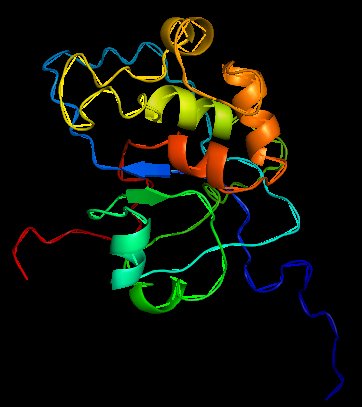
Predicted secondary structure of TEX36 including several alpha helices and beta strands, created with i-Tasser.

	1	2	3	4	5
Alpha Helix	47-48	57-62	148-153	161-167	
Beta Strand	16-21	31-33	70-72	128-140	171-184

=== Post-Translational Modifications ===
14 of the 20 serine residues in TEX36 appear to be post-translationally phosphorylated. There are protein kinase C and casein kinase phosphorylation domains, along with a cAMP phosphodiesterase site and amidation sites. These post translational modifications, specifically phosphorylation, may regulate TEX36 to be off when phosphorylated and in an on conformation when not.

=== Sub-cellular Localization ===
There are a couple of nuclear localization signals, pat4, and strong support from other analyses that TEX36 may be localized to the nucleus. There is not strong support for it to be found in the ER, cytoplasm, or vacuoles. These findings were consistent for the human TEX36 along with distant orthologs, such as the sea anemone and canary.

== Expression and Regulation ==
=== Regulation of Gene Expression ===
The promoter region contains the following regulatory sequences that are in highly conserved regions of TEX36:

Sequence	Number
Spermatogenic Zip1	3
Nanog	1
Sex determining region Y	1
SRY Box 9	2
SRY-related HMG-box 30	1

=== Regulation of Translation ===
In the 5'UTR, there is one stable stem loop, which contains a eukaryotic translation initiation factor motif. There was also a splice factor in the 5'UTR. In both the 5'UTR and 3'UTR are X-linked RNA binding motifs. One of the three stable stem loops in the 3'UTR contained an X-linked RNA binding motif. There were no identified miRNA targets in either untranslated regions.

=== Tissue Expression ===
Based on microarray data, TEX36 is highly expressed in placental, fetal, and testis tissues. Whereas remains are more background levels in other adult tissues. Also, TEX36 has shown to have a two-fold increase in expression levels after exercise, compared to before in endothelial progenitor cells.

== Function ==
=== Interacting Proteins ===
TEX36 has been shown to interact with:

- Dexamethasone-induced Ras-related protein 1
- phosphatase 1 catalytic subunit
- interferon regulatory factor 3

=== Variants, Pathology and Clinical Significance ===
TEX36 is one of 77 proteins expressed by testes capable of interacting with protein phosphatase 1, PP1, human testis protein protein phosphatase 1. One variant of TEX36, p.R142H, was found across all patients in a study on intracranial aneurysms. However, there was no further research on the gene and its protein function. TEX36 has also been found to be a commonly down-regulated gene in patients with microalbuminuria compared to those with normoalbuminuria. Because of the variant associated with intracranial aneurysms and its downregulation associated with various albumin levels, protein changes in TEX36 either in variants or expression levels could be deleterious, but there is no confirmation on these assumptions.

== Homology ==
=== Paralogs ===
There are no known paralogs of TEX36.

=== Ortholog Space ===
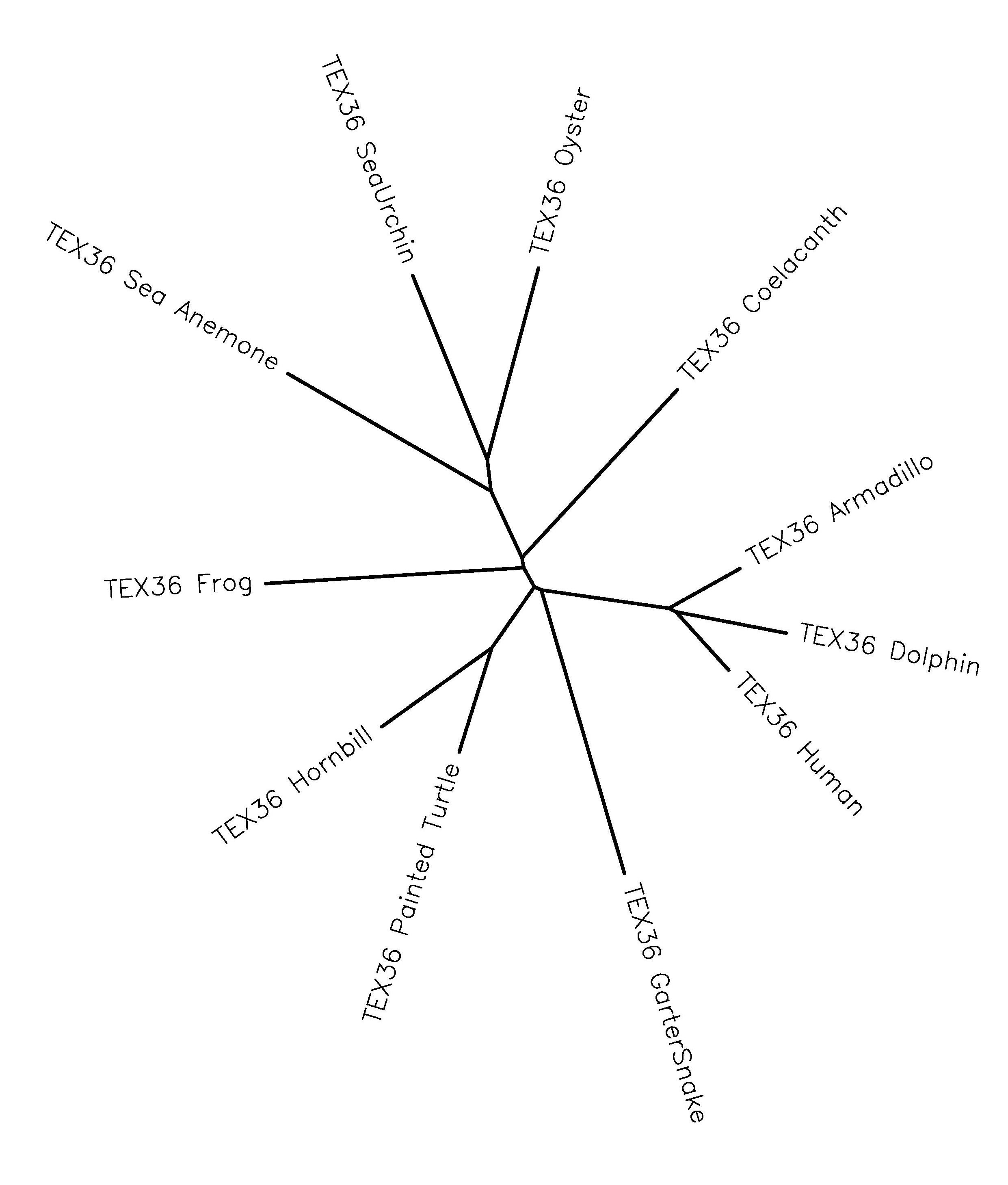
Unrooted phylogenetic tree based on alignment data of TEX36 protein, including 10 orthologs of the protein.

Identified through BLAST and BLAT, species that have contain an ortholog of TEX36, include: mammals, birds, reptiles, amphibians, fish, echinoids, anthozoans, and molluscs. There are no confirmed orthologs in bacteria, fungi/metazoans, plants, or archaea. TEX36 is found often in mammals, fish and birds, and more sparse in the others.

Orthologs of TEX36
Specific Name	Common Name	Order	Accession Number	Divergence Time (MYA)	Length (AA)	Identity	Similarity
Homo sapiens	Human	Primates	NP_001121674.1	0	186	100	100
Panthera tigris altaica	Siberian Tiger	Carnivora	XP_007079755.1	96	182	71.8	80.9
Tursiops truncatus	Bottlenose Dolphin	Artiodactyla	XP_019795781.1	96	163	65.1	71.5
Dasypus novemcinctus	Armadillo	Cingulata	XP_004446737.1	105	181	76.9	82.8
Buceros rhinoceros silvestris	Rhinoceros hornbill	Bucerotiformes	XP_010142644.1	312	187	42.6	57.9
Chrysemys picta bellii	Painted Turtle	Testudines	XP_005281969.1	312	164	38.7	54.8
Xenopus laevis	African Clawed Frog	Anura	XP_018082893.1	352	163	31.1	42.5
Latimeria chalumnae	Ocean Coelacanth	Coelacanthiformes	XP_014343024.1	413	183	33.8	49.3
Strongylocentrotus purpuratus	Purple Sea Urchin	Echinoida	XP_001184205.2	684	200	28.6	28.8
Crassostrea gigas	Pacific Oyster	Ostreoida	XP_011437377.1	797	238	23.5	33.7
Exaiptasia pallida	Sea Anemone	Actiniaria	KXJ14560.1	824	182	23	32

=== Protein Evolution ===
Compared to a fast evolving protein, fibrinogen factor A, and a slow evolving protein, cytochrome c1, TEX36 has a similar rate of evolution to fibrinogen factor A, suggesting it is a fast evolving protein.
