= Competing endogenous RNA =

In molecular biology, competing endogenous RNAs (abbreviated ceRNAs) regulate other RNA transcripts by competing for shared microRNAs (miRNAs). Models for ceRNA regulation describe how changes in the expression of one or multiple miRNA targets alter the number of unbound miRNAs and lead to observable changes in miRNA activity - i.e., the abundance of other miRNA targets. Models of ceRNA regulation differ greatly. Some describe the kinetics of target-miRNA-target interactions, where changes in the expression of one target species sequester one miRNA species and lead to changes in the dysregulation of the other target species. Others attempt to model more realistic cellular scenarios, where multiple RNA targets are affecting multiple miRNAs and where each target pair is co-regulated by multiple miRNA species. Some models focus on mRNA 3' UTRs as targets, and others consider long non-coding RNA targets as well.

Hundreds of publications have described the influence of ceRNA regulation in normal and disease cells, but ceRNA regulation and its effects continue to be debated in scientific circles.

== Summary ==
MicroRNAs are an abundant class of small, non-coding RNAs (~22nt long), which negatively regulate gene expression at the levels of messenger RNAs (mRNAs) stability and translation inhibition. The human genome contains over 1000 miRNAs, each one targeting hundreds of different genes. It is estimated that half of all genes of the genome are targets of miRNA, spanning a large layer of regulation on a post-transcriptional level. The seed region, which comprises nucleotides 2-8 of the 5' portion of the miRNA, is particularly crucial for mRNA recognition and silencing.

Recent studies have shown that the interaction of the miRNA seed region with mRNA is not unidirectional, but that the pool of mRNAs, transcribed pseudogenes, long noncoding RNAs (lncRNA), circular RNA (circRNA) compete for the same pool of miRNA thereby regulating miRNA activity. These competitive endogenous RNAs (ceRNAs) act as molecular sponges for a microRNA through their miRNA binding sites (also referred to as miRNA response elements, MRE), thereby de-repressing all target genes of the respective miRNA family. Experimental evidence for such a ceRNA crosstalk has been initially shown for the tumor suppressor gene PTEN, which is regulated by the 3' untranslated region (3'UTR) of the pseudogene PTENP1 in a DICER-dependent manner.

A new mechanism has recently been shown in which two closely spaced MREs (of the same or of different miRNA families) can cooperatively sequester miRNAs and thereby significantly boost a ceRNA effect. For a cooperative effect to be considered two adjacent MREs, however, have to be of miRNA families that are expressed high enough to actively repress targets and to be less than 58 nucleotides apart.

The biological relevance of the ceRNA hypothesis has been actively debated. Most notably, it has been challenged by a group of researchers that performed a quantitative assessment of two miRNA families (highly and lowly expressed) and their binding sites in liver- and embryonic stem cells as described below. However, these studies were focused on one miRNA per context, and their leading researchers later identified physiologically-relevant ceRNA regulation of another miRNA.

== Debate on physiological relevance ==
Two studies by Bosson et al. (2014) and Denzler et al. (2014) have empirically assessed the ceRNA hypothesis by quantifying the number MREs that must be added to detect ceRNA-mediated gene regulation. Both studies agree that determining the number of transcriptomic miRNA-binding sites is crucial for evaluating the potential for ceRNA regulation and that miRNA binding sites are generally higher than the number of miRNA molecules. However, they differ in two aspects: (1) the experimental approaches used to determine the number of effective transcriptomic miRNA-binding sites and (2) the impact miRNA concentrations have on the number of binding sites that must be added to detect target gene derepression. The discrepancies between these studies lead to different conclusions with respect to the likelihood of observing ceRNA effects in natural settings, with Bosson et al. observing a ceRNA effect at physiologically plausible and Denzler et al. at unphysiological competitor levels.

In a later study, Denzler et al. (2016) has revisited the discrepancies between the two studies and has shown that while miRNA levels define the extent of repression, they have little effect on the number of binding sites that need to be added to observe ceRNA-mediated regulation. Using the same cells and experimental systems as the two studies they suggested that the number of binding sites are very high and better reflects the estimates of the study by Denzler et al. (2014), and that low-affinity/background miRNA sites (such as 6-nt sites, offset 6-nt sites, non-canonical sites) significantly contribute to competition. Due to this large number of background sites, their model suggests that prospects of observing an effect from a ceRNA are greatly reduced. Bosia et al. used single-cell assays to demonstrate substantial ceRNA crosstalk in instances where there is a balance between binding site counts, miRNAs, and target RNA expression profiles.

Opponents of the ceRNA hypothesis pointed out that irrefutable proof of ceRNA-mediated gene regulation still remains to be shown since most studies either overexpress RNA transcripts at unphysiological levels or lack seed mutation controls when up- or down-regulating potential ceRNA transcripts. A mechanistically elegant study is especially important, as supporters argue that the quantity of work alone is in favor the ceRNA hypothesis. Two recent studies resolved this issue, demonstrating physiological effects and site-specific effects for ceRNA regulation. Supporters of the ceRNA hypothesis criticized the studies by Denzler et al. for their focus on competition for a single miRNA. They argue that since ceRNA regulations are orchestrated through the cooperative effect of multiple miRNA families, the study by Denzler et al. does not represent a typical ceRNA competitor and can therefore not be used to generalize. In addition, supporters are not surprised that our mechanistic understanding of ceRNA regulation remains incomplete. Instead, they point out that hundreds of genetics and molecular biology studies have found ceRNA regulation physiologically relevant.

== Experimentally validated regulators and networks ==
=== High-throughput validation of ceRNA regulatory networks ===
Chiu et al. used LINCS data to support the regulation of hundreds of genes by ceRNA interactions in prostate and breast adenocarcinomas.

=== PTEN ceRNA Network ===
PTEN is a critical tumor suppressor gene which is frequently altered in multiple human cancers and is a negative regulator of the oncogenic Phosphoinositide 3-kinase/Akt signaling pathway. Three studies have identified and successfully validated protein-coding transcripts as PTEN ceRNAs in prostate cancer, glioblastoma and melanoma. PTEN ceRNAs CNOT6L, VAPA and ZEB2 have been shown to regulate PTEN expression, PI3K signaling, and cell proliferation in a 3'UTR- and microRNA-dependent manner. Similarly, in glioblastoma, siRNA-mediated silencing of 13 predicted PTEN ceRNAs including Retinoblastoma protein (RB1), RUNX1 and VEGFA downregulated PTEN expression in a 3'UTR-dependent manner and increased tumor cell growth. However, a replication effort of the initial prostate cancer study found that many of the results could not be replicated, and that many of the experimental interventions had no effect, or the opposite effect of what was originally reported.

Additionally, PTEN's non protein-coding pseudogene, PTENP1, is able to affect PTEN expression, downstream PI3K signaling and cell proliferation by directly competing for PTEN-targeting microRNAs.

=== Linc-MD1 ===
Linc-MD1, a muscle-specific long non-coding RNA, activates muscle-specific gene expression by regulating expression of MAML1 and MEF2C via antagonizing miR-133 and miR-135. Whether Linc-MD1 regulates miRNA activity by sequestering miRNA through a typical ceRNA mechanism or if the highly complementary miR-133 site regulates miRNA activity through target-directed degradation remains to be shown.

=== BRAFP1 ===
BRAFP1, the BRAF (gene) pseudogene, has been implicated in the development of cancer, including B-cell lymphoma, by acting as a ceRNA for BRAF. Upregulation of BRAFP1 led to an overexpression of the BRAF oncogene.

=== Hepatitis C virus (HCV) ===
Hepatitis C has shown been suggested to regulate miR-122 through be a ceRNA mechanism when overexpressed in Huh-7.5 cells. It however still remains to be shown whether Hepatitis C can reach the high titers necessary in vivo in order to modulate gene expression through a ceRNA mechanism.

=== KRAS1P ===
Another pseudogene shown to have ceRNA activity is that of the proto-oncogene KRAS, KRAS1P, which increases KRAS transcript abundance and accelerates cell growth.

=== CD44 ===
The CD44 3'UTR has been shown to regulate expression of the CD44 protein and cell cycle regulation protein, CDC42, by antagonizing the function of three microRNAs - miR-216, miR-330 and miR-608.

=== Versican ===
The versican 3'UTR has been shown to regulate expression of the matrix protein fibronectin via antagonizing miR-199a function.

=== HSUR 1, 2 ===
T cells transformed by the primate virus Herpesvirus saimiri (HVS) have been shown to express viral U-rich noncoding RNAs called HSURs. Several of these HSURs are able to bind to and compete for three host-cell microRNAs and thus regulate host-cell gene expression.

=== ESR1 ===
ESR1 has been shown to be regulated by multiple miRNAs that are highly expressed in ER-negative breast cancer, and its 3' UTR was shown to regulate and be regulated by 3' UTRs of CCND1, HIF1A and NCOA3.

=== MYCN ===
MYCN amplification in neuroblastoma has been shown to deplete the abundance of its miRNA regulators, supporting MYCN's role as a master ceRNA regulator in neuroblastoma.

=== HULC ===
Highly Up-regulated in liver cancer (HULC) is one of the most upregulated of all genes in hepatocellular carcinoma. CREB (cAMP response element binding protein) has been implicated in the upregulation of HULC. HULC RNA inhibits miR-372 activity through a ceRNA function, leading to derepression of one of its target genes, PRKACB, which can then induce the phosphorylation and activation of CREB. Overall, HULC lncRNA is part of a self-amplifying autoregulatory loop in which it sponges miR-372 to activate CREB, and in turn upregulates its own expression levels.

=== ceRNA in bacteria ===
Bacteria do not have miRNA, and instead, ceRNAs in these organisms compete for small RNAs (sRNAs) or RNA-binding proteins (RBPs). Similarly, competition by ceRNAs for RNA-binding proteins has also been reported in eukaryotic cells.

== See also ==
- CeRNA database
- StarBase (biological database)
- Gene expression
- Epigenetics
- MicroRNA
- Tumor suppressor gene
- PTEN
