= ZCCHC17 =

Protein-coding gene in humans

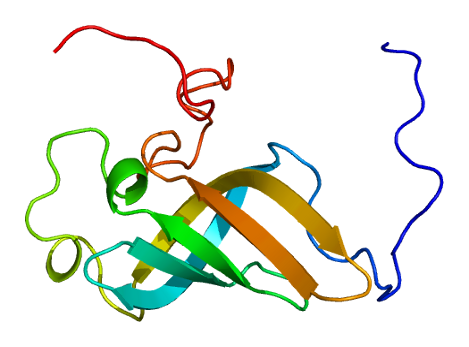

Identifiers
- Aliases: ZCCHC17, HSPC251, PS1D, pNO40, zinc finger CCHC-type containing 17
- External IDs: MGI: 1919955; GeneCards: ZCCHC17
Available structures
PDB	Ortholog search: PDBe RCSB
PDB	List of PDB id codes 2CQO

Gene location (Human)
Chr.	Chromosome 1 (human)
Band	1p35.2	Start	31,296,982 bp
Band	1p35.2	End	31,364,953 bp
RNA expression pattern
Bgee	Human / Mouse (ortholog); Top expressed in: C1 segment; hypothalamus; amygdala; cingulate gyrus; anterior cingulate cortex; prefrontal cortex; right frontal lobe; substantia nigra; Brodmann area 9; middle temporal gyrus / n/a; More reference expression data
BioGPS	n/a
Gene ontology
Molecular function	zinc ion binding; protein binding; metal ion binding; nucleic acid binding; RNA binding
Cellular component	nucleolus; nucleus
Biological process	xenophagy; positive regulation of defense response to virus by host
Sources:Amigo / QuickGO
Orthologs
Databases	NCBI: entry; OMA: entry
Species	Human	Mouse
Entrez	51538	619605
Ensembl	ENSG00000121766	ENSMUSG00000028772
UniProt	Q9NP64	Q9ESX4
RefSeq (mRNA)	NM_001282566; NM_001282567; NM_001282568; NM_001282569; NM_001282570 NM_001282571; NM_001282572; NM_001282573; NM_001282574; NM_016505	NM_153160
RefSeq (protein)	NP_001269495; NP_001269496; NP_001269497; NP_001269498; NP_001269499 NP_001269500; NP_001269501; NP_001269502; NP_001269503; NP_057589	NP_694800; NP_001342327; NP_001342328; NP_001342329
Location (UCSC)	Chr 1: 31.3 – 31.36 Mb	n/a
PubMed search
- Wikidata
View/Edit Human	View/Edit Mouse

Nucleolar protein of 40 kDa is a protein that in humans is encoded by the ZCCHC17 gene.

== See also ==
- Complementary DNA (cDNA)
- Ribonucleoprotein
- RNA-binding protein
- Zinc finger
