= CLIPZ =

Bioinformatics database

CLIPZ:

Content
- Description: Experimentally determined binding sites of RNA-binding proteins.

Contact
- Research center: Swiss Institute of Bioinformatics
- Primary citation: PMID 21087992
- Release date: 2010

Access
- Website: http://www.clipz.unibas.ch

CLIPZ is a database of post-transcriptional regulatory elements (RNA-binding proteins) built from cross-linking and immunoprecipitation data.

== See also ==
- RNA-binding protein
- List of biological databases
