= StarBase (biological database) =

Biological database

Content
- Description: microRNA-mRNA interaction maps from Argonaute CLIP-Seq and Degradome-Seq data.

Contact
- Research center: Sun Yat-sen University
- Laboratory: Key Laboratory of Gene Engineering of the Ministry of Education
- Authors: Jian-Hua Yang
- Primary citation: Yang & al. (2011)
- Release date: 2010

Access
- Website: http://starbase.sysu.edu.cn/

StarBase is a database for decoding miRNA-mRNA, miRNA-lncRNA, miRNA-sncRNA, miRNA-circRNA, miRNA-pseudogene, protein-lncRNA, protein-ncRNA, protein-mRNA interactions, and ceRNA networks from CLIP-Seq (HITS-CLIP, PAR-CLIP, iCLIP, CLASH) and degradome sequencing data. StarBase provides miRFunction and ceRNAFunction web tools to predict the function of ncRNAs (miRNAs, lncRNAs, pseudogenes) and protein-coding genes from the miRNA and ceRNA regulatory networks. StarBase also developed Pan-Cancer Analysis Platform to decipher Pan-Cancer Analysis Networks of lncRNAs, miRNAs, ceRNAs, and RNA-binding proteins (RBPs) by mining clinical and expression profiles of 14 cancer types (including more than six thousand samples) from The Cancer Genome Atlas (TCGA) Data Portal.

== See also ==
- MicroRNA and microRNA target database
- MicroRNA
- Degradome sequencing
