= RepTar (database) =

Content
- Description: predicted cellular targets of host and viral miRNAs.

Contact
- Research center: Hebrew University-Hadassah Medical School
- Laboratory: Prof. Hanah Margalit, Department of Microbiology and Molecular Genetics
- Authors: Naama Elefant, Amnon Berger, Harel Shein, Matan Hofree, Hanah Margalit, Yael Altuvia
- Primary citation: Elefant & al. (2011)
- Release date: 2010

Access
- Website: http://reptar.ekmd.huji.ac.il

RepTar is a repository of cellular targets of host and viral miRNAs.

== See also ==
- MiRTarBase
- MESAdb
- PmiRKB
- microRNA
