= PmiRKB =

Content
- Description: plant microRNA database
- Organisms: Arabidopsis thaliana Oryza sativa

Contact
- Research center: Zhejiang University
- Authors: Yijun Meng
- Primary citation: Meng & al. (2011)
- Release date: 2010

Access
- Website: https://bis.zju.edu.cn/pmirkb/

PmiRKB is a database of plant miRNAs.

== See also ==
- MiRTarBase
- MESAdb
- microRNA
