= CIRBP =

Protein-coding gene in humans

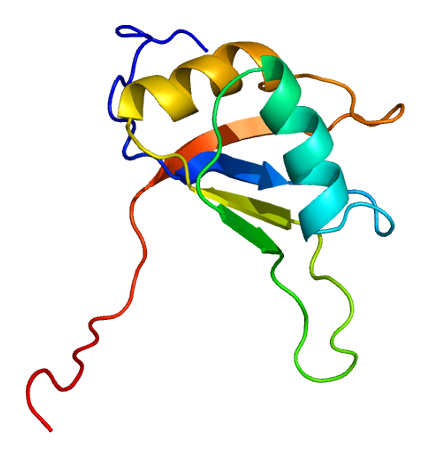

Identifiers
- Aliases: CIRBP, CIRP, cold inducible RNA binding protein
- External IDs: OMIM: 602649; MGI: 893588; GeneCards: CIRBP
Available structures
| PDB | Ortholog search: PDBe RCSB |
| PDB | List of PDB id codes 1X5S |

Gene location (Human)
| Chr. | Chromosome 19 (human) |
| Band | 19p13.3 | Start | 1,259,384 bp |
| Band | 19p13.3 | End | 1,274,880 bp |

Gene location (Mouse)
| Chr. | Chromosome 10 (mouse) |
| Band | 10 C1|10 39.72 cM | Start | 80,165,985 bp |
| Band | 10 C1|10 39.72 cM | End | 80,172,786 bp |
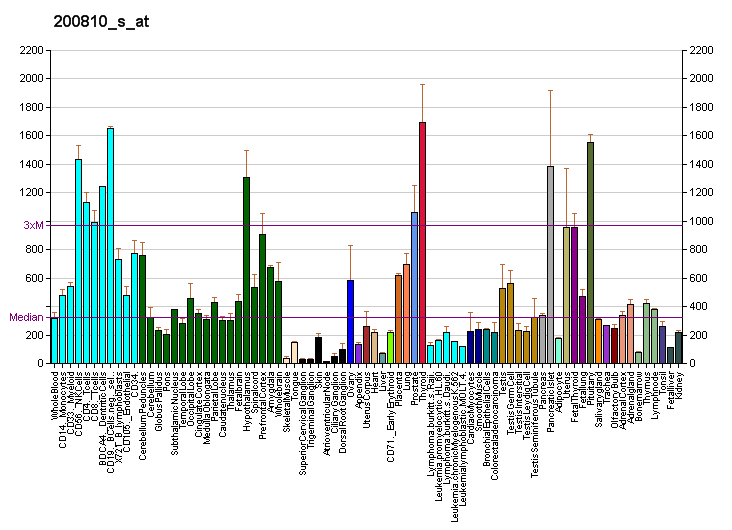

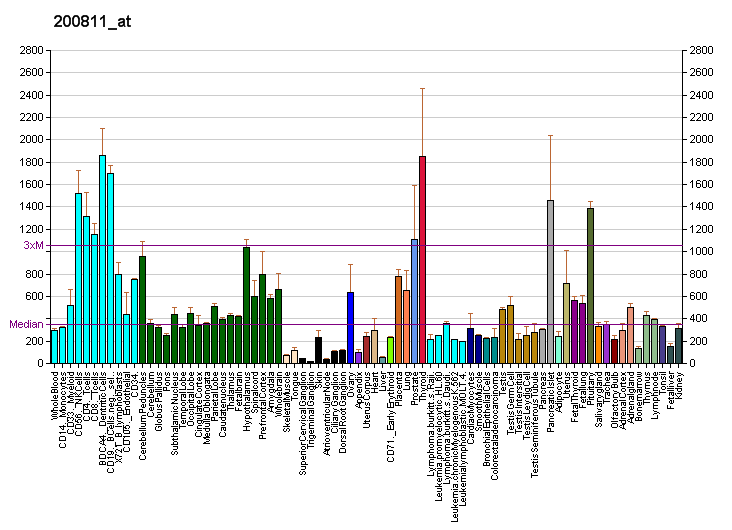
RNA expression pattern
| Bgee | Human / Mouse (ortholog); Top expressed in: tibia; corpus epididymis; caput epididymis; parietal pleura; germinal epithelium; right hemisphere of cerebellum; right uterine tube; anterior pituitary; middle temporal gyrus; left ovary / Top expressed in: neural layer of retina; lip; cerebellar cortex; molar; ventricular zone; spermatocyte; superior frontal gyrus; primary visual cortex; dorsomedial hypothalamic nucleus; paraventricular nucleus of hypothalamus; More reference expression data |
| BioGPS | More reference expression data |
Gene ontology
| Molecular function | translation repressor activity; nucleic acid binding; protein binding; small ribosomal subunit rRNA binding; mRNA 3'-UTR binding; RNA binding; poly(U) RNA binding |
| Cellular component | cytoplasm; cytoplasmic stress granule; nucleolus; nucleus; nucleoplasm; spliceosomal complex; ribonucleoprotein complex |
| Biological process | stress granule assembly; response to cold; mRNA stabilization; response to UV; positive regulation of translation; negative regulation of translation; positive regulation of mRNA splicing, via spliceosome |
Sources:Amigo / QuickGO
Orthologs
| Databases | NCBI: entry; OMA: entry |
| Species | Human | Mouse |
| Entrez | 1153 | 12696 |
| Ensembl | ENSG00000099622 | ENSMUSG00000045193 |
| UniProt | Q14011; Q53XX5 | P60824 |
| RefSeq (mRNA) | NM_001280; NM_001300815; NM_001300829 | NM_007705 |
| RefSeq (protein) | NP_001271; NP_001287744; NP_001287758; NP_001271.1 | NP_031731; NP_001366350; NP_001366351; NP_001366352; NP_001366353 NP_001366354 |
| Location (UCSC) | Chr 19: 1.26 – 1.27 Mb | Chr 10: 80.17 – 80.17 Mb |
| PubMed search |
- Wikidata
| View/Edit Human | View/Edit Mouse |

Cold-inducible RNA-binding protein is a protein that in humans is encoded by the CIRBP gene. The cold-inducible, RNA-binding protein CIRBP plays a critical role in controlling the cellular response upon confronting a variety of cellular stresses, including short wavelength ultraviolet light, hypoxia, and hypothermia. It is thought to be involved in DNA repair.
