= PTENP1 =

Identifiers
- Aliases: PTENP1, PTEN-rs, PTEN2, PTENpg1, PTH2, psiPTEN, phosphatase and tensin homolog pseudogene 1
- External IDs: OMIM: 613531; GeneCards: PTENP1; OMA:PTENP1 - orthologs

Gene location (Human)
Chr.	Chromosome 9 (human)
Band	9p13.3	Start	33,673,504 bp
Band	9p13.3	End	33,677,499 bp
Orthologs
Species	Human	Mouse
Entrez	11191	n/a
Ensembl	ENSG00000237984	n/a
UniProt	n a	n/a
RefSeq (mRNA)	n/a	n/a
RefSeq (protein)	n/a	n/a
Location (UCSC)	Chr 9: 33.67 – 33.68 Mb	n/a
PubMed search		n/a
- Wikidata
View/Edit Human

Phosphatase and tensin homolog (mutated in multiple advanced cancers 1), pseudogene 1, also known as PTENP1, is a human pseudogene which has a partial reactivated function as a competing endogenous RNA regulating the tumor suppressor gene PTEN.
