= Mir-190 microRNA precursor family =

Short RNA molecule

mir-190

Identifiers
- Symbol: mir-190
- Rfam: RF00672
- miRBase family: 10

Other data
- RNA type: microRNA
- Domain(s): Eukaryota;
- PDB structures: PDBe

In molecular biology mir-190 microRNA is a short RNA molecule. MicroRNAs function is to regulate the expression levels of other genes by several mechanisms.

== See also ==
- MicroRNA
