= Mitochondrial 2-oxodicarboxylate carrier =

Protein-coding gene in the species Homo sapiens

SLC25A21

Identifiers
- Aliases: SLC25A21, ODC, ODC1, solute carrier family 25 member 21, MTDPS18
- External IDs: OMIM: 607571; MGI: 2445059; GeneCards: SLC25A21

Gene location (Human)
Chr.	Chromosome 14 (human)
Band	14q13.3	Start	36,677,921 bp
Band	14q13.3	End	37,172,606 bp

Gene location (Mouse)
Chr.	Chromosome 12 (mouse)
Band	12|12 C1	Start	56,759,419 bp
Band	12|12 C1	End	57,244,257 bp
RNA expression pattern
Bgee	Human / Mouse (ortholog); Top expressed in: gonad; testicle; stromal cell of endometrium; gastric mucosa; popliteal artery; tibial arteries; bone marrow; right testis; Achilles tendon; smooth muscle tissue / Top expressed in: proximal tubule; bone marrow; right kidney; hepatobiliary system; liver; human kidney; spermatocyte; lobe of liver; morula; embryo; More reference expression data
BioGPS	n/a
Gene ontology
Molecular function	alpha-ketoglutarate transmembrane transporter activity; dicarboxylic acid transmembrane transporter activity; transmembrane transporter activity
Cellular component	membrane; mitochondrion; mitochondrial inner membrane; integral component of membrane
Biological process	transmembrane transport; lysine catabolic process; alpha-ketoglutarate transport; dicarboxylic acid transport; mitochondrial transport
Sources:Amigo / QuickGO
Orthologs
Databases	NCBI: entry; OMA: entry
Species	Human	Mouse
Entrez	89874	217593
Ensembl	ENSG00000183032	ENSMUSG00000035472
UniProt	Q9BQT8	Q8BZ09
RefSeq (mRNA)	NM_001171170; NM_030631	NM_001167976; NM_172577
RefSeq (protein)	NP_001164641; NP_085134	NP_001161448; NP_766165
Location (UCSC)	Chr 14: 36.68 – 37.17 Mb	Chr 12: 56.76 – 57.24 Mb
PubMed search
- Wikidata
View/Edit Human	View/Edit Mouse

Mitochondrial 2-oxodicarboxylate carrier also known as solute carrier family 25 member 21 (SLC25A21) is a protein that in humans is encoded by the SLC25A21 gene.

It is a homolog of the S. cerevisiae ODC proteins, mitochondrial carriers that transport C5-C7 oxodicarboxylates across inner mitochondrial membranes. One of the species transported by ODC is 2-oxoadipate, a common intermediate in the catabolism of lysine, tryptophan, and hydroxylysine in mammals. Within mitochondria, 2-oxoadipate is converted into acetyl-CoA.
