= MESAdb =

Database for the analysis of sequences and expression of microRNA

mESAdb

Content
- Description: microRNA expression and sequence analysis.

Contact
- Research center: Bilkent University
- Laboratory: Department of Molecular Biology and Genetics
- Authors: Koray Dogan Kaya
- Primary citation: Kaya & al. (2011)

Access
- Website: http://konulab.fen.bilkent.edu.tr/mirna

mESAdb is a database for the analysis of sequences and expression of microRNA

== See also ==
- MiRTarBase
- microRNA
