= Reptar (vulnerability) =

Intel CPU vulnerability discovered in late 2023

CVE-2023-23583
- CVSS 3.x score: 7.8
- CVSS 3.x vector: CVSS:3.1/AV:L/AC:L/PR:L/UI:N/S:U/C:H/I:H/A:H
- Date discovered: 2023
- Affected hardware: Alder Lake, Raptor Lake, Sapphire Rapids

Reptar is a CPU vulnerability discovered in late 2023, affecting a number of recent families of Intel x86 CPUs. According to The Register, the following CPU families are vulnerable: Alder Lake, Raptor Lake and Sapphire Rapids.

The Reptar vulnerability relates to processing of x86 instruction prefixes in ways that lead to unexpected behavior. It was discovered by Google's security team. The vulnerability can be exploited in a number of ways, potentially leading to information leakage, denial of service, or privilege escalation.

It has been assigned the CVE ID CVE-2023-23583. Intel has released new microcode in an out-of-band patch to mitigate the vulnerability, which it calls "redundant prefix".

== See also ==
- Reptar – Fictional character from the Rugrats cartoon
