= CeRNA database =

Competing endogenous RNAs (ceRNAs, also refer as miRNA sponges) hypothesis: ceRNAs regulate other RNA transcripts (e.g., PTEN) by competing for shared microRNAs. They are playing important roles in developmental, physiological and pathological processes, such as cancer. Multiple classes of ncRNAs (lncRNAs, circRNAs, pseudogenes) and protein-coding mRNAs function as key ceRNAs (sponges) and to regulate the expression of mRNAs in plants and mammalian cells.

This competing endogenous RNA (ceRNA) databases and resources is a compilation of databases and web portals and servers used for ceRNA prediction and ceRNA networks.

Name	Description	type	References
ceRNABase	ceRNABase is designed for decoding Pan-Cancer ceRNA networks involving lncRNAs and mRNAs by analyzing 5599 tumor and normal samples and 108 CLIP-Seq (HITS-CLIP, PAR-CLIP, iCLIP, CLASH) datasets.	database and server	
cefinder	Competing endogenous RNA database: predicted ceRNA candidates from genome.	database	
ceRNAFunction	ceRNAFunction is a web server to predict lncRNA and protein functions from pan-cancer ceRNA networks using 13 functional terms (including: GO, KEGG, BIOCARTA, etc.).	webserver	
Cupid	Cupid is a method for simultaneous prediction of miRNA-target interactions and their mediated competing endogenous RNA (ceRNA) interactions. It is an integrative approach significantly improves on miRNA-target prediction accuracy as assessed by both mRNA and protein level measurements in breast cancer cell lines. Cupid is implemented in 3 steps: Step 1: re-evaluate candidate miRNA binding sites in 3' UTRs. Step2: interactions are predicted by integrating information about selected sites and the statistical dependency between the expression profiles of miRNA and putative targets. Step 3: Cupid assesses whether inferred targets compete for predicted miRNA regulators.	software (MATLAB)	
Hermes	Hermes predicts ceRNA (competing endogenous RNA) interactions from expression profiles of candidate RNAs and their common miRNA regulators using conditional mutual information.	software (MATLAB)	
Linc2GO	a human LincRNA function annotation resource based on ceRNA webserver.	database	
.
