= RBMS3 =

Identifiers
- Aliases: RBMS3, RNA binding motif single stranded interacting protein 3
- External IDs: OMIM: 605786; MGI: 2444477; GeneCards: RBMS3

Gene location (Human)
| Chr. | Chromosome 3 (human) |
| Band | 3p24.1 | Start | 28,574,791 bp |
| Band | 3p24.1 | End | 30,010,391 bp |

Gene location (Mouse)
| Chr. | Chromosome 9 (mouse) |
| Band | 9|9 F3 | Start | 116,401,814 bp |
| Band | 9|9 F3 | End | 117,701,749 bp |
RNA expression pattern
| Bgee | Human / Mouse (ortholog); Top expressed in: trigeminal ganglion; pericardium; Achilles tendon; saphenous vein; spinal ganglia; sural nerve; lactiferous duct; synovial joint; vena cava; tail of epididymis / Top expressed in: vas deferens; trigeminal ganglion; efferent ductule; internal carotid artery; external carotid artery; substantia nigra; otolith organ; utricle; hand; facial motor nucleus; More reference expression data |
| BioGPS | n/a |
Gene ontology
| Molecular function | RNA binding; nucleic acid binding; mRNA 3'-UTR binding; poly(A) binding; poly(U) RNA binding; mRNA 3'-UTR AU-rich region binding |
| Cellular component | cytoplasm; nucleus; cytosol; ribonucleoprotein complex |
| Biological process | positive regulation of translation; defense response to tumor cell; positive regulation of gene expression; negative regulation of gene expression; negative regulation of canonical Wnt signaling pathway |
Sources:Amigo / QuickGO
Orthologs
| Databases | NCBI: entry; OMA: entry |
| Species | Human | Mouse |
| Entrez | 27303 | 207181 |
| Ensembl | ENSG00000144642 | ENSMUSG00000039607 |
| UniProt | Q6XE24 | Q8BWL5 |
| RefSeq (mRNA) | NM_001003792; NM_001003793; NM_001177711; NM_001177712; NM_014483 NM_001330696 | NM_001172121; NM_001172122; NM_001172123; NM_001172124; NM_001172126 NM_178660 |
| RefSeq (protein) | NP_001003792; NP_001003793; NP_001171182; NP_001171183; NP_055298 NP_001317625 | NP_001165592; NP_001165593; NP_001165594; NP_001165595; NP_001165597 NP_848775 |
| Location (UCSC) | Chr 3: 28.57 – 30.01 Mb | Chr 9: 116.4 – 117.7 Mb |
| PubMed search |
- Wikidata
| View/Edit Human | View/Edit Mouse |

RNA-binding motif, single-stranded-interacting protein 3 is a protein that in humans is encoded by the RBMS3 gene.
