= ZGPAT =

Protein-coding gene in the species Homo sapiens

Identifiers
- Aliases: ZGPAT, GPATC6, GPATCH6, KIAA1847, ZC3H9, ZC3HDC9, ZIP, zinc finger CCCH-type and G-patch domain containing
- External IDs: MGI: 2449939; GeneCards: ZGPAT
Available structures
PDB	Ortholog search: PDBe RCSB
PDB	List of PDB id codes 4II1

Gene location (Human)
Chr.	Chromosome 20 (human)
Band	20q13.33	Start	63,707,465 bp
Band	20q13.33	End	63,736,142 bp

Gene location (Mouse)
Chr.	Chromosome 2 (mouse)
Band	2|2 H4	Start	181,006,721 bp
Band	2|2 H4	End	181,025,421 bp
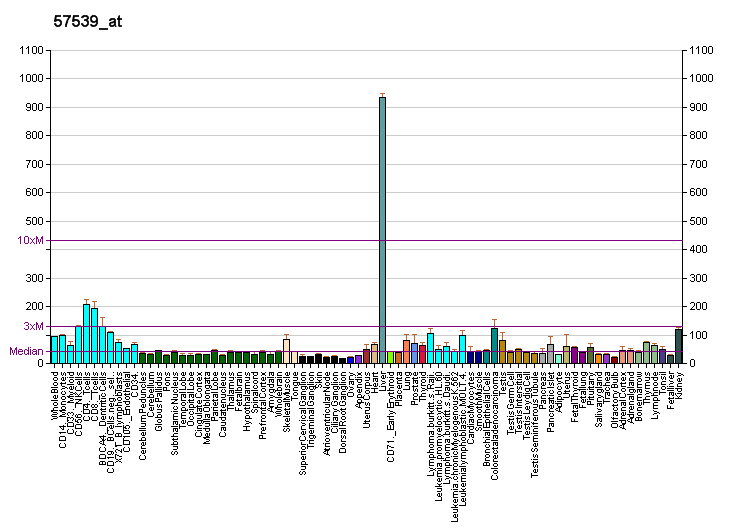

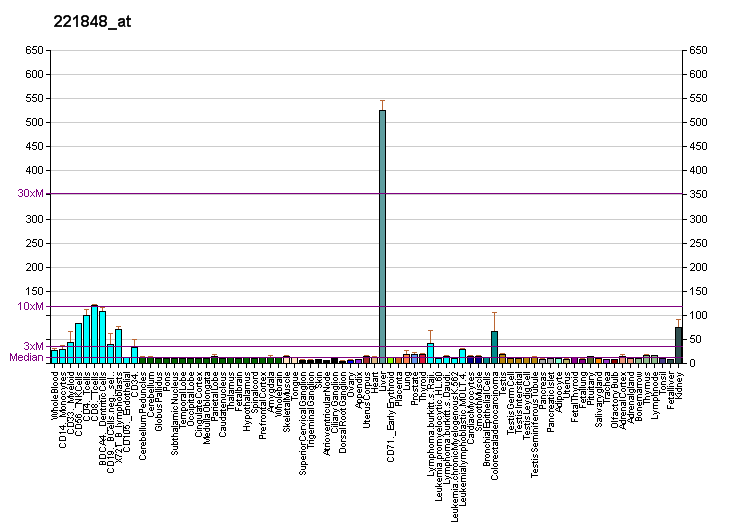
RNA expression pattern
Bgee	Human / Mouse (ortholog); Top expressed in: right lobe of liver; granulocyte; blood; sural nerve; spleen; apex of heart; monocyte; mucosa of transverse colon; human kidney; right hemisphere of cerebellum / Top expressed in: bronchus; hypothalamus; cerebellar cortex; olfactory bulb; mesencephalon; superior frontal gyrus; primary visual cortex; lens; striatum of neuraxis; neural tube; More reference expression data
BioGPS	More reference expression data
Gene ontology
Molecular function	DNA-binding transcription factor activity; RNA polymerase II cis-regulatory region sequence-specific DNA binding; sequence-specific DNA binding; DNA binding; DNA-binding transcription repressor activity, RNA polymerase II-specific; protein binding; metal ion binding; nucleic acid binding; DNA-binding transcription factor activity, RNA polymerase II-specific
Cellular component	nucleus; plasma membrane
Biological process	negative regulation of epidermal growth factor-activated receptor activity; negative regulation of transcription, DNA-templated; regulation of transcription, DNA-templated; negative regulation of transcription by RNA polymerase II; transcription, DNA-templated
Sources:Amigo / QuickGO
Orthologs
Databases	NCBI: entry; OMA: entry
Species	Human	Mouse
Entrez	84619	229007
Ensembl	ENSG00000197114	ENSMUSG00000027582
UniProt	Q8N5A5	Q8VDM1
RefSeq (mRNA)	NM_181485; NM_001083113; NM_001195653; NM_001195654; NM_032527 NM_181484	NM_001048148; NM_144894
RefSeq (protein)	NP_001076582; NP_001182582; NP_001182583; NP_115916; NP_852150	NP_001041613; NP_659143
Location (UCSC)	Chr 20: 63.71 – 63.74 Mb	Chr 2: 181.01 – 181.03 Mb
PubMed search
- Wikidata
View/Edit Human	View/Edit Mouse

Zinc finger CCCH-type with G patch domain-containing protein is a protein that in humans is encoded by the ZGPAT gene.
