= MiRTarBase =

Database of MicroRNA-Target Interactions

miRTarBase

Content
- Description: Experimentally validated microRNA-target interactions (MTIs).
- Data types captured: miRNA-target interactions

Contact
- Research center: National Chiao Tung University; Chinese University of Hong Kong, Shenzhen
- Authors: Hsien-Da Huang and colleagues
- Release date: v1.0: 2013; v10.0: 2024

Access
- Website: http://mirtarbase.cuhk.edu.cn
- Download URL: http://mirtarbase.cuhk.edu.cn/php/download.php

Miscellaneous
- Version: 10.0

miRTarBase is a curated database of MicroRNA-Target Interactions. Generally, the collected MTIs are validated experimentally by reporter assay, western blot, microarray and next-generation sequencing experiments.

The first version of the miRTarBase has accumulated more than fifty thousand miRNA-target interactions (MTIs), which are collected by manually surveying pertinent literature after data mining of the text systematically to filter research articles related to functional studies of miRNAs. miRTarBase has been regularly updated since the original release in 2011. The most recent update (miRTarBase 2025 / version 10.0) reports over 3,817,550 experimentally validated miRNA–target interactions curated from 13,690 articles.

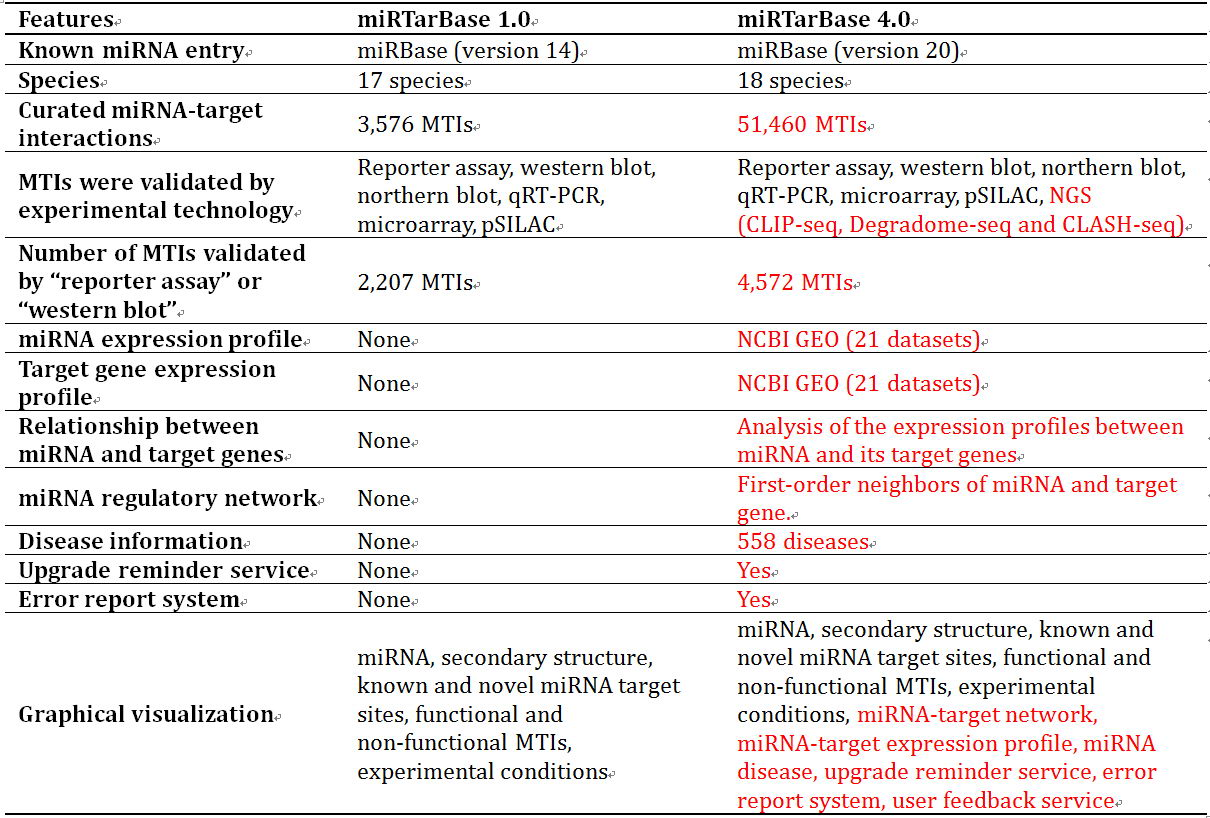
miRTarBase improvements

== See also ==
- MicroRNAs
