= Anti-thrombin aptamers =

Oligonucleotides which recognize the exosites of human thrombin

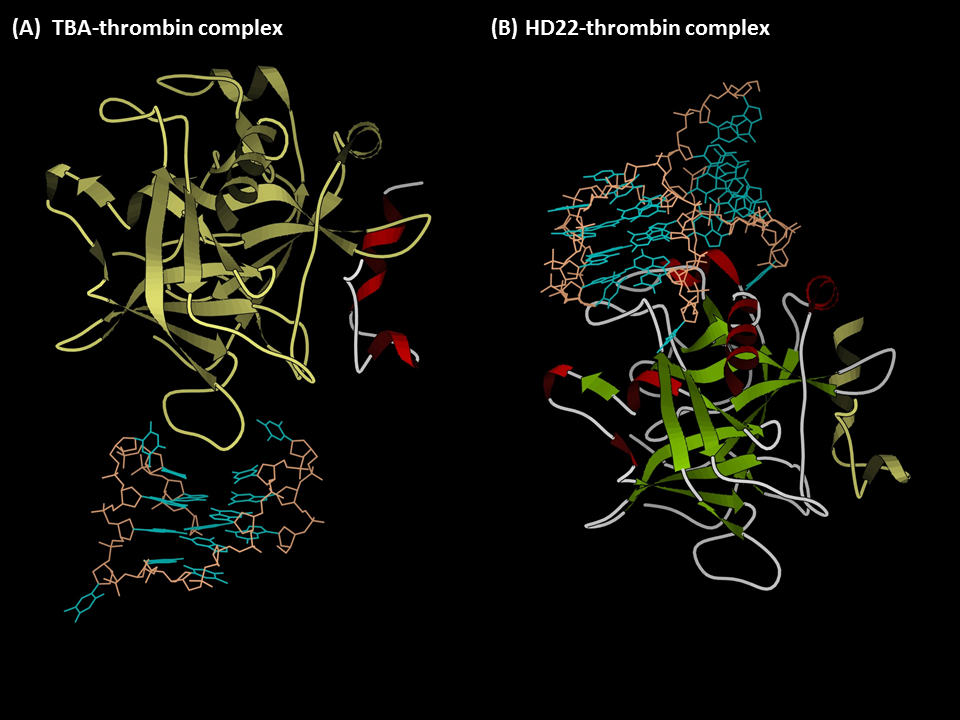
The complexes of (A) TBA-thrombin and (B) HD22-thrombin (PDB files 4DII and 4I7Y). The protein and aptamer were represented in the ribbon and ball&stick formats, respectively.

Anti-thrombin aptamers are G-quadruplex-bearing oligonucleotides, which recognizes the exosites of human thrombin. The first anti-thrombin aptamer, TBA, was generated through via SELEX (Systematic Evolution of Ligands by Exponential Enrichment) technology in 1992 by L.C. Bock, J.J. Toole and colleagues. A second thrombin-binding aptamer, HD22, recognizes thrombin exosite II and was discovered in 1997 by NeXstar (now Gilead Sciences). These two aptamers have high affinity and good specificity and have been widely studied and used for the development of aptamer-based therapeutics and diagnostics.

== Aptamer TBA (the exosite I-binding aptamer) ==
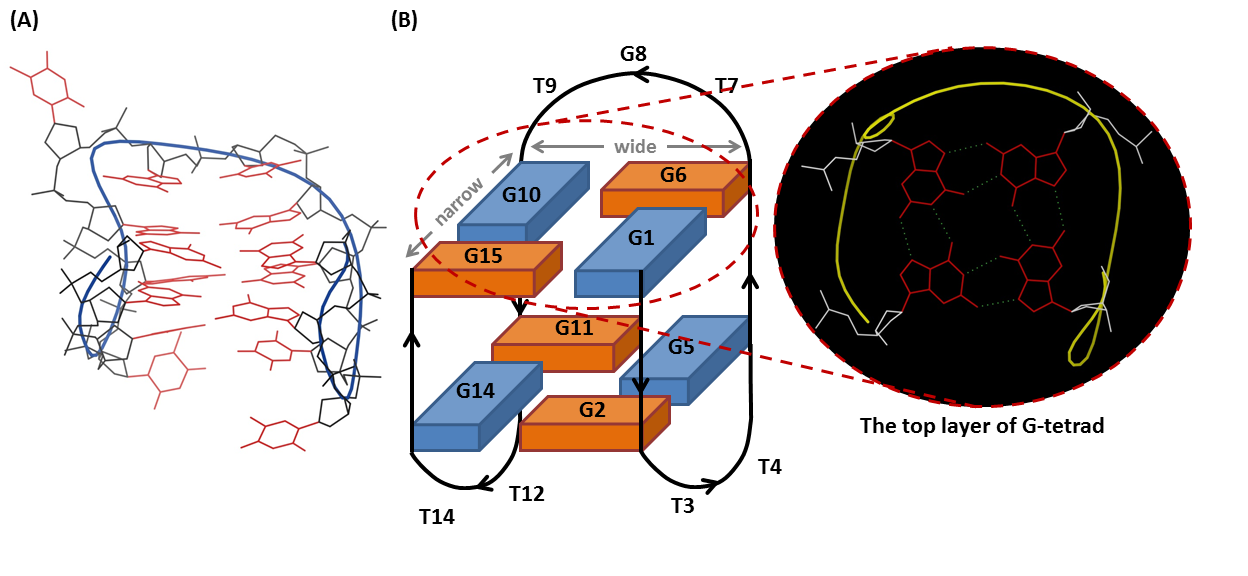
The G-quadruplex structure adopted by TBA. (A) The crystallographic structure and (B) the schematic illustration of TBA (PDB file 4DII). Insert: the top layer of G-tetrad (The Hoogsteen-like hydrogen bonds are highlighted with green dashed lines).

The aptamer TBA (also known as G15D, HTQ, HD1, ARC183, GS522, BC-007, or Rovunaptabin) is a 15-mer single-stranded DNA with the sequence 5'-GGTTGGTGTGGTTGG-3'. It interacts with the exosite I of human alpha-thrombin, which is the binding site of fibrinogen, so this aptamer acts as an anti-coagulant agent inhibiting the activation of fibrinogen as well as platelet aggregation. In addition, TBA shows good affinity and specificity against thrombin. The dissociation constant of TBA-thrombin has been reported in nano-molar range, and TBA does not interact with other plasma proteins or thrombin analogues (e.g., gamma-thrombin). As a result, TBA has been used as a short-term anti-coagulant designed for the application in the coronary artery bypass graft surgery, and its optimized form (NU172) is now under the phase II of clinical trial by ARCA Biopharma (NCT00808964). Also, due to its high affinity and specificity, a variety of sensors was coupled with TBA and developed for thrombosis diagnostics.

=== TBA structure ===
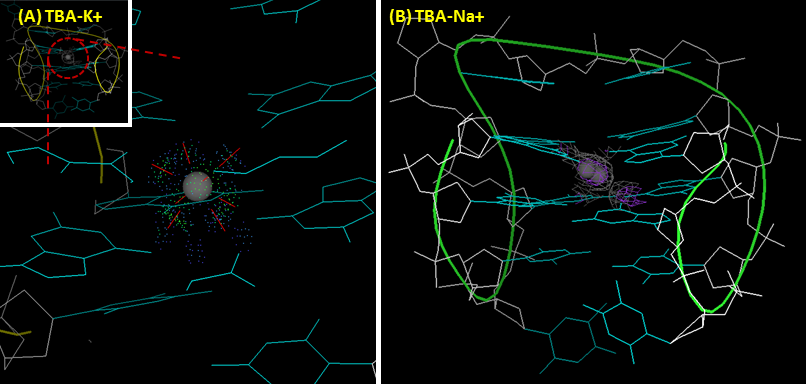
The interactions between TBA and ions. (A) TBA-potassium ion complex. Potassium ion fits the cavity between the two G-tetrad planes of TBA properly and coordinately interacts with eight O6 atoms in G-quadruplex. (insert: the whole structure of TBA-K+ complex) (B) TBA-sodium ion complex. Two alternative positions of sodium observed, and sodium can only interacts with four rather than eight oxygens.

The tertiary structure of TBA is an anti-parallel G-quadruplex. This chair-like structure is folded through the stacking of two guanine (G)-tetrads, and four guanines interacts with one another through non Watson-Crick-like hydrogen bonds (more likely Hoogsteen-like hydrogen bonds). In the structure of TBA, G1, G6, G10 and G15 form the top layer of G-tetrad; G2, G5, G11 and G14 form the second layer. The first crystallographic images with 2.9 Å resolution (1HUT) was reported in 1993. It showed that the T7-G8-T9 loop and TT loops (T3-T4 and T12-T13) connected the narrow and the wide grooves, respectively. However, since the improved NMR (1HAO) and X-ray crystallographic images (4DIH; 4DII) were provided, another topology with the TGT loop on the wide side and the TT loops on the narrow sites has been considered as a correct structure of TBA.

In addition to protein-selectivity, TBA also shows ion preference. A potassium ion helps TBA fold into a G-quadruplex structure, which results in a significant positive band at 295 nm and a negative band at 270 nm on its circular dichroism (CD) spectrum. Also, potassium ion improves the thermal stability of TBA. The melting temperature of TBA's G-quadruplex (measuring the intensity change of the peak at 295 nm by CD) in the presence of sodium ion and potassium are 24 °C and 53 °C, respectively. Compared with sodium, potassium ion fits perfectly to the cavity between two G-tetrad plane and is coordinately bound to four O6 atoms in each plane. This enhances the structural stability of TBA. In contrast, due to its small size, sodium ion can only interacts with four rather than eight oxygen atoms of two G-tetrad planes, and accordingly has two alternative position in the cavity. Thrombin shows similar influence as potassium ion. In the ion-deficient condition, thrombin helps TBA form into a stable G-quadruplex structure from a randomized coil, which results in conformational change. Some groups use this property to develop aptamer-based thrombin sensors. For this purpose, TBA is usually mounted with an additional sequence with a FRET (Förster resonance energy transfer) pair to form a transient duplex structure. Once the TBA part interacts with thrombin, the conformational change would change the distance between the FRET pair and lead to a fluorescent output. This approach provides nano-molar sensitivity and is capable of sensing thrombin in the spiked serum.

=== mTBA ===
A modified TBA with chain polarity inversion was reported in 1996, which is known as mTBA. A 5'-5' inversion was designed between T3 and T4 in mTBA sequence (3′-GGT-5′-5′TGGTGTGGTTGG-3′). This improves the thermal stability of G-quadruplex structure, and increases the melting temperature by 4 °C. In spite of this, the anticoagulant activity is affected and reduced by the inversion design.

=== Interactions between TBA and thrombin ===
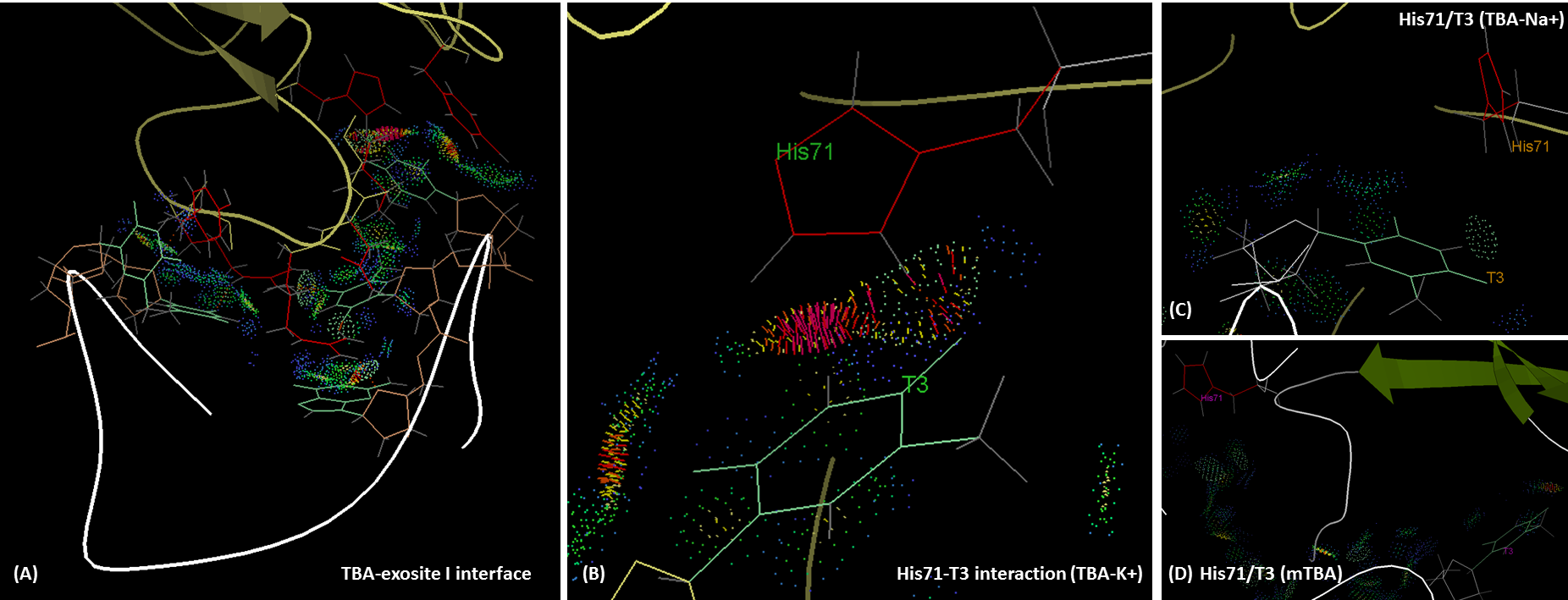
The interface between TBA and the exosite I of thrombin. (A) The interface. Involved protein residues and aptamer nucleotides are labeled with red and green, respectively. (B) The interaction between His71 and T3 (TBA) in the presence of potassium ion. (C) The positions of His 71 and T3 (TBA) in the presence of sodium ion. (D) The positions of His71 and T3 (mTBA). Dots represent the interactions between thrombin and aptamer.

TBA is bound to the exosite I of thrombin majorly via its two TT loops (T3, T4 and T12, T13) through polar and hydrophobic interactions. The residues His71, Arg75, Tyr76, Arg77, Asn78, Ile79, Tyr117 in the exosite I epitope are involved in the interaction with TBA. Exosite 1, being a positively charged motif, engages in these interactions with the negatively charged backbone of HD1. Importantly, T3 interacts with His71, which plays a critical role for fibrinogen recognition, both through hydrogen bonding and hydrophobic interaction. However, in the presence of sodium ion, the hydrogen bonding between T3 and His71 is lost, and the intermolecular distance is longer than that in the potassium case. This reduces the affinity and functionality of TBA. Similar situation can be found in the case of mTBA. There are no interactions between mTBA and His71, which results in the reduction of anticoagulant activity. The results of In silico calculations with molecular mechanics Poisson-Boltzmann surface area (MM-PBSA) method, suggest that the calculated binding energy (ΔG) of TBA to thrombin exosite I is slightly stronger is the presence of K+ (-66.73 kcal.mol-1) than in the case of Na+ (-60.29kcal.mol-1), however both states are likely to coexist.

=== Therapeutic applications ===
It has been demonstrated that TBA can inhibit the thrombin-induced platelet aggregation and clot-bound thrombin activity. The IC50 of TBA for the inhibition of platelet aggregation (0.5 U/mL thrombin) is around 70 to 80 nmol/L, which is much lower than that of hirudin (~1.7 umol/L). Also, compared with heparin, TBA is more efficient in the inhibition of clot-bound thrombin. Furthermore, TBA recognizes and inhibits prothrombin with similar affinity against alpha-thrombin. As a result, TBA prolongs the prothrombin time when interacting with prothrombin. TBA entered the phase I clinical trial for coronary artery bypass graft surgery by Archemix and Nuvelo (now ARCA Biopharma) around 2005. Although it showed a rapid onset response with desired anticoagulation activity, the activity requires significantly high dosage of TBA. Thus, the companies redesigned the sequence of TBA and developed a second-generation 26-mer DNA aptamer known as NU172, which is now under phase II clinical trial.

Thrombin is a popular target for biosensing given its involvement in many pathological diseases, such as atherosclerosis and thrombosis. As such, TBA can function as a thrombin detector, with TBA coated microlasers serving as the first soluble lasing biosensors of their kind.

== Aptamer HD22 (the exosite II-binding aptamer) ==
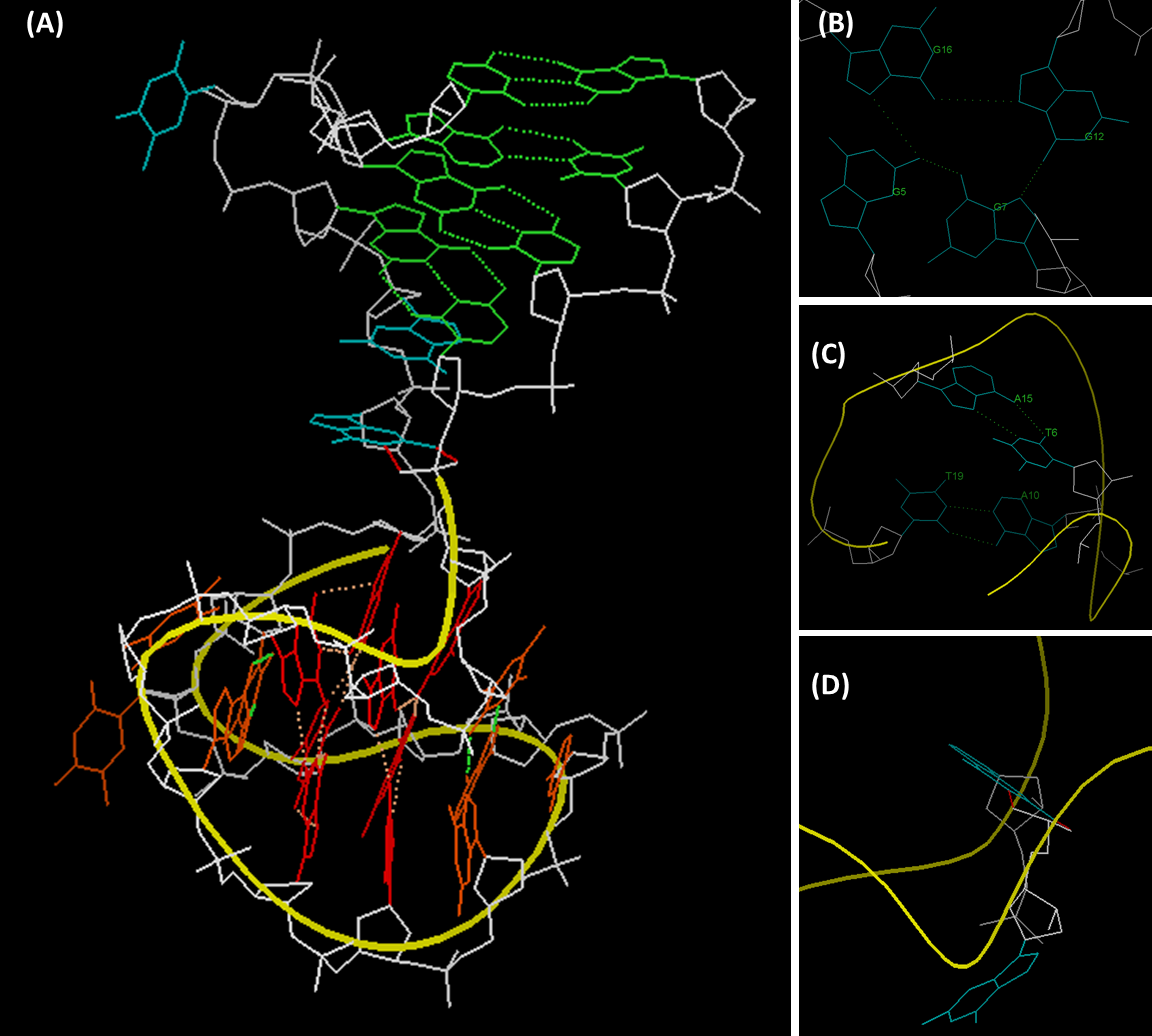
HD22 structure and interbase interaction. (A) Overall structure of HD22. (B) Top G-tetrad plane (C) The Watson-Crick base pairs in the G-quadruplex motif. (D) G-fork interaction between G-quadruplex and duplex motifs

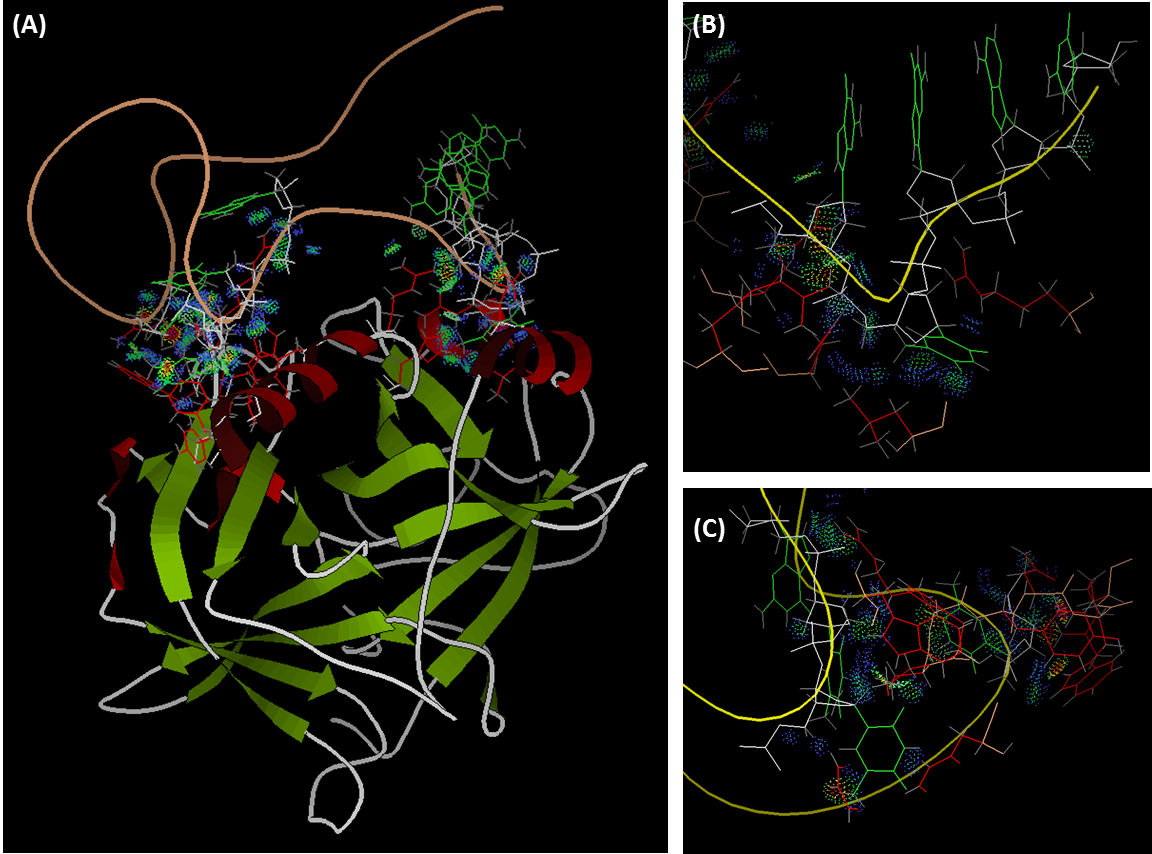
HD22-exosite II interaction. (A) Overall interface between HD22 and the exosite II. (B) The interface at the duplex motif. (C) The interface at the G-quadruplex motif. Dots represent the interactions.

The aptamer HD22 (also known as HTDQ) is an optimized aptamer with 29 (5'-AGTCCGTGGTAGGGCAGGTTGGGGTGACT-3') or 27 (lacking the first and the last nucleotides of 29-mer form) nucleotides. This aptamer recognizes the exosite II of thrombin, which is involved in the activation of factor V and factor VIII and mediates the heparin binding. Therefore, HD22 inhibits the activations of factors V/VIII rather than that of fibrinogen. Despite that this aptamer only shows moderate effect on fibrinogen regulation, the affinity of this aptamer is slightly higher than TBA (KD~0.5 nM), and nowadays this aptamer is widely used for developments of aptamer sensor.

=== HD22 structure ===
Unlike TBA, HD22 holds a duplex/G-quadruplex mixed structure. The X-ray crystallographic image of HD22 (27mer form) with 2.4 Å resolution was reported recently (4I7Y). The nucleotides 1-3 and 25-27 with an additional C4-G23 form a duplex motif, and the sequence ranging from G5 to G20 folds into a G-quadruplex structure with four connection loops: T9-A10, T18-T19, G13-C14-A15 and a one-nucleotide loop (T6). In the core of G-quadruplex motif, two G-tetrad planes are formed by G5-G7-G12-G16 and G8-G11-G17-G20. The upper plane (G5-G7-G12-G16) is not a typical G-tetrad with the chain topology of anti-syn-anti-syn alternation. Instead, three guanines (G5, G7 and G16) adopt syn conformation, and only one guanine (G12) adopts anti conformation. Additionally, the one-nucleotide loop inserted between G5 and G7. These make G-tetrad formed not through a typically cyclic pattern. This unusual G-tetrad plan is formed by four hydrogen bonds: one on N2:N7(G5-G16), two on O6:N7(G12-G7; G16-G12) and one on O6:N2 (G7-G5). Some other interactions could be found in the G-quadruplex motif: two Watson-Crick base pairs (T6-A15 and A10-T19) and a G-fork (G5-G21). Importantly, because of the interaction between G5 and G21, there is a 90-degree turn between the G-qudruplex and duplex motifs.

=== Interactions between HD22 and thrombin ===
The nucleotides G23, T24, G25, A26, C27 in the duplex and T9, T18, T19, G20 in G-quadruplex contribute to the interaction with the exosite II of thrombin. On the protein side, the residues Tyr89, His91, Pro92, Arg93, Tyr94, Asn95, Trp96, Arg97, Arg126, Leu130, Arg165, Lys169, His230, Arg233, Trp237, Val241 and Phe245 in thrombin are involved in the interaction. Since the exosite II is a positively charged motif, it creates many ion pairs with the HD22 backbone especially in the duplex region. Hydrophobic interactions are mainly observed in the G-quadruplex region (T9, T18 and T10), and this stabilizes the complex formation. Moreover, Interacting with thrombin improves the thermal stability of HD22 structure, and results in the increase of melting temperature (from 36 to 48 °C). Calculated binding energy of HD22 to thrombin exosite II is -88.37 -kcal.mol-1.

== Avidity effect of TBA and HD22 ==
Similar to antibody, aptamers TBA and HD22 show avidity effect against thrombin after dimerization. When TBA and HD22 are conjugated with an optimal linker or co-printed on the sensor surface with an optimal density, the affinity against thrombin could be significantly enhanced by 100 to 10,000 fold. Furthermore, the dimerization improves the anticoagulant activity as well. The TBA-HD22 construct (linked with 16-mer polyA) shows significant improvement both in the assay of activated partial thromboplastin time, clotting time and thrombin-induced platelet-aggregation. TBA-HD22 construct shows comparable efficacy compared with bivalirudin, but much more potent than argatroban. In addition, the TBA-HD22 avidity can be examined by ecarin clotting time. Ecarin activates prothrombin and accordingly produces meizothrombin. The exosite II is not accessible in meizothrombin, so thus the HD22 part cannot interact with meizothrombin directly. As a result, TBA-HD22 construct cannot improve the ecarin clotting time, which further demonstrates the improvement of aptamer functionality is due to TBA-HD22 avidity.
