= Overlap extension polymerase chain reaction =

Variant of polymerase chain reaction

The overlap extension polymerase chain reaction (or OE-PCR) is a variant of PCR. It is also referred to as Splicing by overlap extension / Splicing by overhang extension (SOE) PCR. It is used to assemble multiple smaller double stranded DNA fragments into a larger DNA sequence. OE-PCR is widely used to insert mutations at specific points in a sequence or to assemble custom DNA sequence from smaller DNA fragments into a larger polynucleotide.

== Splicing of DNA molecules ==
This image shows how OE-PCR might be utilized to splice two DNA sequences (red and blue). The arrows represent the 3' ends

As in most PCR reactions, two primers—one for each end—are used per sequence. To splice two DNA molecules, special primers are used at the ends that are to be joined. For each molecule, the primer at the end to be joined is constructed such that it has a 5' overhang complementary to the end of the other molecule. Following annealing when replication occurs, the DNA is extended by a new sequence that is complementary to the molecule it is to be joined to. Once both DNA molecules are extended in such a manner, they are mixed and a PCR is carried out with only the primers for the far ends. The overlapping complementary sequences introduced will serve as primers and the two sequences will be fused. This method has an advantage over other gene splicing techniques in not requiring restriction sites.

To get higher yields, some primers are used in excess as in asymmetric PCR.

== Introduction of mutations ==
This image shows how OE-PCR might be utilized to delete a sequence from a DNA strand

To insert a mutation into a DNA sequence, a specific primer is designed. The primer may contain a single substitution or contain a new sequence at its 5' end. If a deletion is required, a sequence that is 5' of the deletion is added, because the 3' end of the primer must have complementarity to the template strand so that the primer can sufficiently anneal to the template DNA.

Following annealing of the primer to the template, DNA replication proceeds to the end of the template. The duplex is denatured and the second primer anneals to the newly formed DNA strand, containing sequence from the first primer. Replication proceeds to produce a strand of the required sequence, containing the mutation.

The duplex is denatured again and the first primer can now bind to the latest DNA strand. The replication reaction continues to produce a fully dimerised DNA fragment. After further PCR cycles, to amplify the DNA, the sample can be separated by agarose gel electrophoresis, followed by electroelution for collection.

Efficiently generating oligonucleotides beyond ~110 nucleotides in length is very difficult, so to insert a mutation further into a sequence than a 110 nt primer will allow, it is necessary to employ overlap extension PCR. In OE-PCR the sequence being modified is used to make two modified strands with the mutation at opposite ends, using the technique described above. After mixing and denaturation, the strands are allowed to anneal to produce three different combinations as detailed in the diagram. Only the duplex without overlap at the 5' end will allow extension by DNA polymerase in 3' to 5' direction.

Following the extension of the OE-PCR reaction, the PCR mix or the eluted fragments of appropriate size are subject to normal PCR, using the outermost primers used in the initial, mutagenic PCR reactions.

In addition, the combination of OE-PCR and asymmetric PCR could be used to improved the efficiency of site-directed mutagenesis.

== Applications in molecular cloning ==
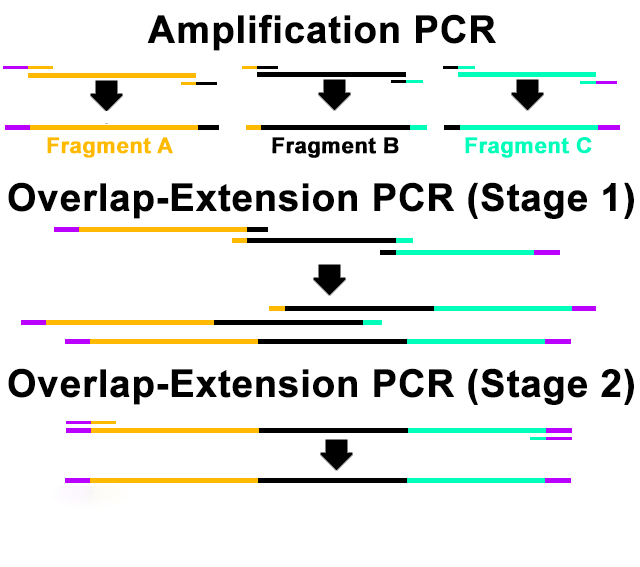
The image depicts the 3 main steps of OE-PCR Reaction.

Besides the introduction of mutations, Overlap Extension PCR is widely used to assemble complex DNA sequences without the introduction of undesired nucleotides at any position. This is possible since OE-PCR relies on the utilization of complementary overhangs to guide the scarless splicing of custom DNA fragments in a desired order. This is the main advantage of OE-PCR and other long-homology based cloning methods such as Gibson assembly, which overcome the limitations of traditional restriction enzyme digestion and ligation cloning methods.

Assembly of custom DNA sequences with OE-PCR consists on three main steps. First, individual DNA sequences are amplified by PCR from different templates and flanked with the required complementary overhangs. Second, the formerly obtained PCR products are combined together into the overlap extension PCR reaction, where the complementary overhangs bind pair-wise allowing the polymerase to extend the DNA strand. Eventually, outer primers targeting the external overhangs are used and the desired DNA product is amplified in the final PCR reaction.

=== Technical Considerations ===
The overall success of OE-PCR based DNA assemblies relies on several factors, being the most relevant ones the instrinsic features of the DNA sequence to assemble, the sequence and length of the overlapping overhangs, the design of outer primers for the final amplification and the conditions of the PCR reaction. Normally, from 2 to 6 fragments can be spliced simultaneously into a single OE-PCR reaction. Overhangs should be at least 40 nucleotides long to ensure adequate interaction between fragments. Final amplification primers are commonly designed following general guidelines for PCR, however they are used in 2 to 5 times lower concentration than in standard PCR reactions, as it this has been shown to reduce undesired amplifications. Additionally the utilization of proofreading DNA polymerases is highly recommended.
