= Ronald Breaker =

American biochemist

Ronald R. Breaker
- Born: 1964 (age 61–62)
- Education: University of Wisconsin–Stevens Point, Purdue University, Scripps Research Institute
- Known for: Riboswitches, Ribozymes, Deoxyribozymes
- Awards: Beckman Young Investigators Award
- Scientific career
- Fields: Biochemistry, Molecular Biology
- Workplaces: Yale University
- Doctoral advisor: Peter T. Gilham
- Other academic advisors: Gerald Joyce

Ronald R. Breaker (born 1964) is an American biochemist who has been a Sterling Professor of Molecular, Cellular, and Developmental Biology at Yale University since 1995. He is best known for the discovery of riboswitches, a common RNA regulatory element. His current research is focused on understanding advanced functions of nucleic acids, including the discovery and analysis of riboswitches and ribozymes.

== Research ==
Ronald earned his B.S. in biology and chemistry from the University of Wisconsin–Stevens Point and his Ph.D. in biochemistry from Purdue University with Peter T Gilham. He was a postdoctoral fellow at The Scripps Research Institute with Gerald Joyce. While at Scripps, he isolated the first DNA enzyme (deoxyribozyme). He joined the molecular, cellular, and developmental biology department at Yale University. His research group worked on in vitro engineered riboswitches, RNA biosensors, and began to look for riboswitches in nature and identified the Cobalamin riboswitch. Over the next decade, the group would perform pivotal work establishing the role of ligand-binding RNAs and resulted in the discovery of multiple classes of riboswitches.

He has been a Howard Hughes Medical Institute Investigator since 2005. Breaker is a member of the JASON defense advisory group, and was elected to the U.S. National Academy of Sciences in 2013.

== Awards ==
- Fellow of the American Association for the Advancement of Science, 2004
- American Society for Microbiology Eli Lilly Award, 2005
- NAS Award in Molecular Biology, 2006
- Rolf Sammet Professorship, Goethe University Frankfurt, 2012
- Distinguished Alumni Award, University of Wisconsin–Stevens Point, 2010
- U.S. National Academy of Sciences, 2013
- Distinguished Alumni Award, Purdue University, 2014
- ASBMB–Merck Award, 2016
