= C24H34O5 =

The molecular formula C_{24}H_{34}O_{5} (molar mass: 402.52 g/mol) may refer to:

- Bufagin, a toxic steroid obtained from toad's milk
- Cortexolone 17α-propionate
- Dehydrocholic acid
- ZYN-001
