= List of investigational long COVID drugs =

Investigational long COVID drugs

This is a list of investigational long COVID drugs, or drugs that are currently under development for clinical use for the treatment of post-acute COVID-19 syndrome (long COVID) but are not yet approved.

Chemical/generic names are listed first, with developmental code names, synonyms, and brand names in parentheses. The format of list items is "Name (Synonyms) – Mechanism of Action [Reference]".

This list was last comprehensively updated in September 2025. It is likely to become outdated with time.

== Under development ==
=== Phase 2/3 ===
- Ibudilast (AV-411; Eyevinal; Ibinal; KC-404; Ketas; MN-166; Pinatos) – phosphodiesterase PDE4 inhibitor and toll-like receptor 4 (TLR4) antagonist
- Sodium pyruvate (EmphyClear; N115) – various actions
- low-dose Sirolimus (rapamycin; rapimune)

=== Phase 2 ===
- AER-002 – monoclonal antibody against SARS-CoV-2 spike protein
- Allogeneic human umbilical cord blood haematopoietic progenitor cell therapy (Regenecyte; HPC-cord blood) – cell replacement
- Bezisterim (HE-3286; NE-3107; Triolex; 17α-ethynyl-5-androstene-3β,7β,17β-triol) – undefined mechanism of action (synthetic androstenetriol analogue and anti-inflammatory)
- Celecoxib/valacyclovir (IMC-2) – combination of celecoxib (COX-2 inhibitor/NSAID) and valacyclovir (antiviral/viral DNA polymerase inhibitor)
- Cyclobenzaprine (KRL-102; TNX-102; Tonmya) – tricyclic antidepressant (monoamine reuptake inhibitor and monoamine receptor modulator)
- Leronlimab (PA-14; PRO-140; Vyrologix) – monoclonal antibody against CCR5
- Nogapendekin alfa inbakicept (ALT-803; Anktiva; IL-15N72D/IL-15Ra-Fc; N-803; VesAnktiva) – fusion protein and interleukin-15 receptor agonist
- Rintatolimod (AMP-516; AMP-518; Ampligen; Atvogen; Rintamod; PolyI:PolyC12U) – mismatched double-stranded polymer of RNA (dsRNA) and toll-like receptor 3 (TLR3) agonist
- Rovunaptabin (BC-007) – oligonucleotide aptamer (binds to and neutralizes autoantibodies against GPCRs)
- RSLV-132 – fusion protein (RNase fused to the Fc domain of IgG1)
- Sipavibart (AZD-3152; Kavigale) – monoclonal antibody against SARS-CoV-2 spike protein
- Temelimab (GENHP-01; GNbAC-1; GNN-001) – monoclonal antibody against human endogenous retrovirus-W (HERV-W) and consequent toll-like receptor 4 (TLR4) inhibitor
- Vidofludimus calcium (4SC-101; IM-90838; IMU-838; SC-12267; VidoCa) – dihydroorotate dehydrogenase (DHODH) inhibitor and Nurr1 activator

=== Preclinical ===
- Foralumab (NI-0401; NI-0401/α-CD3; TZLS-401) – monoclonal antibody against CD3
- LTI-2355 – phagocyte modulator
- Maraviroc/atorvastatin – combination of maraviroc (antiviral/CCR5 receptor antagonist) and atorvastatin (statin)

=== Research ===
- SFA-006 – GPR43 modulator

=== Clinical phase unknown ===
- Ensitrelvir (S-217622; Xocova) – antiviral (coronavirus 3C-like proteinase inhibitor)
- Lidocaine delivered in complex with HP-β-cyclodextrin; investigated for long COVID following a 36-week prospective observational interrupted time-series study reporting symptom improvement

== Not under development ==
=== Discontinued ===
- AXA-1125 (AXA1125) – combination of five amino acids (leucine, isoleucine, valine, arginine, and glutamine) and an amino acid derivative (N-acetylcysteine) ("increases β-oxidation and improves bioenergetics")
- Deupirfenidone (deuterated pirfenidone; LYT-100; LYT-100-COV; LYT-100-ILD; LYT-100-LYMPH; SD-560) – deuterated pirfenidone (collagen inhibitor and anti-inflammatory/immunomodulator)
- DMI-9523 (Ampion; DA-DKP; LMWF-5A) – nuclear factor NF-κB activation inhibitor and anti-inflammatory

== Clinically used drugs ==
=== Approved drugs ===
- None

=== Off-label drugs ===
- α_{2}-Adrenergic receptor agonists (e.g., clonidine, guanfacine)
- AMPA receptor antagonists (e.g., perampanel)
- Analgesics (e.g., acetaminophen, NSAIDs)
- Antidepressants (e.g., SSRIs, SNRIs, TCAs, mirtazapine, bupropion, trazodone, vortioxetine, St. John's wort)
- Antihistamines (H_{1} receptor antagonists) (e.g., cetirizine, fexofenadine, loratadine)
- Antivirals (e.g., lopinavir/ritonavir, acyclovir, nirmatrelvir/ritonavir, remdesivir)
- Atypical antipsychotics (e.g., aripiprazole, risperidone, brexpiprazole, quetiapine)
- Beta blockers (e.g., propranolol, metoprolol)
- C1 esterase inhibitor (recombinant)
- Corticosteroids (e.g., hydrocortisone, dexamethasone)
- Fluvoxamine (Luvox)
- Histamine H_{2} receptor antagonists (e.g., famotidine)
- Immunoglobulin (intravenous)
- Melatonin
- Monoamine oxidase inhibitors (MAOIs) (e.g., rasagiline)
- Monoclonal antibodies (e.g., adalimumab, infliximab)
- N-Acetylcysteine (NAC)
- Naltrexone (low-dose)
- Probiotics and prebiotics
- Serotonergic psychedelics (e.g., psilocybin)
- Sleep aids (e.g., orexin receptor antagonists, benzodiazepines, Z-drugs, melatonin, herbal sleep aids)
- Stimulants (e.g., amphetamine, methylphenidate)
- Vitamins, minerals, and other dietary supplements (e.g., coenzyme Q10, selenium, B vitamins, vitamin D, iron, omega-3 fatty acids, magnesium, carnitine)
- Wakefulness-promoting agents (e.g., modafinil, armodafinil)

== See also ==
- List of investigational drugs
- List of investigational ME/CFS drugs
- List of investigational fibromyalgia drugs
- List of investigational fatigue drugs
- List of investigational orthostatic intolerance drugs
