= List of investigational ME/CFS drugs =

Investigational myalgic encephalomyelitis/chronic fatigue syndrome drugs

This is a list of investigational myalgic encephalomyelitis/chronic fatigue syndrome drugs, or drugs that are currently under development for clinical use for the treatment of myalgic encephalomyelitis/chronic fatigue syndrome (ME/CFS) but are not yet approved.

Chemical/generic names are listed first, with developmental code names, synonyms, and brand names in parentheses. The format of list items is "Name (Synonyms) – Mechanism of Action [Reference]".

This list was last comprehensively updated in September 2025. It is likely to become outdated with time.

== Under development ==
=== Phase 2/3 ===
- Duloxetine (Ariclaim; Cymbalta; LY-227942; LY-248686; Xeristar; Yentreve) – serotonin–norepinephrine reuptake inhibitor (SNRI)

=== Phase 2 ===
- Bocidelpar (ASP-0367; MA-0211; MTB-1) – peroxisome proliferator-activated receptor δ (PPARδ) modulator
- OSU-6162 (PNU-9639; PNU-96391; PNU-96391A) – serotonin 5-HT_{2A} receptor partial agonist (non-hallucinogenic), dopamine D_{2} receptor partial agonist, and sigma σ_{1} receptor ligand (so-called "monoaminergic stabilizer")

=== Phase 1/2 ===
- CT-38 (CT38) – CRF receptor type 2 modulator

=== Preclinical ===
- Flmodafinil (CRL-40,940; NLS-14; NLS-4; JBG01-41; bisfluoromodafinil; lauflumide) – selective atypical dopamine reuptake inhibitor

== Not under development ==
=== No development reported ===
- Celecoxib/famciclovir (IMC-1) – combination of celecoxib (COX-2 inhibitor/NSAID) and famciclovir (antiviral)
- Methylphenidate (KPAX-002) – norepinephrine–dopamine reuptake inhibitor (NDRI)
- Midodrine (Amatine; Gudon; Gutron; Metligine; Midon; ProAmatine; ST-1085; TS-701) – α_{1}-adrenergic receptor agonist
- Rovunaptabin (BC-007) – oligonucleotide aptamer (binds to and neutralizes autoantibodies against GPCRs)
- Valganciclovir (Cymeval; R127; RG-127; RO-1079070/194; RS-079070194; RS-79070; TA-9070; Valcyte; Valgancyclovir; Valixa) – antiviral

=== Discontinued ===
- Alpha-1 antitrypsin modified process (Alpha-1 MP; Lynspad; Prolastin; Prolastina; Pulmolast; TAL-6004) – immunomodulator and serine endopeptidase inhibitor
- Droxidopa (L-DOPS; Threo-DOPS; Northera) – norepinephrine prodrug and non-selective adrenergic receptor agonist
- Galantamine (GP-37267; Nivalin; R-113675; Razadyne; Reminyl) – acetylcholinesterase inhibitor
- Research programme: androgen-based therapeutics - CPEX – androgen receptor agonists
- SPV-30 – undefined mechanism of action

=== Formal development never or not yet started ===
- Solriamfetol (Sunosi) – norepinephrine–dopamine reuptake inhibitor

== Clinically used drugs ==
=== Approved drugs ===
- Rintatolimod (AMP-516; AMP-518; Ampligen; Atvogen; Rintamod; PolyI:PolyC12U) – mismatched double-stranded polymer of RNA (dsRNA) and toll-like receptor 3 (TLR3) agonist – only approved and available in Argentina

=== Off-label drugs ===
- Analgesics (e.g., acetaminophen, NSAIDs)
- Antidepressants (e.g., SSRIs, SNRIs, TCAs, MAOIs, mirtazapine, bupropion, trazodone)
- Antivirals (e.g., inosine pranobex)
- Atypical antipsychotics (e.g., aripiprazole)
- Corticosteroids (e.g., hydrocortisone, fludrocortisone)
- Gabapentinoids (α_{2}δ voltage-dependent calcium channel ligands) (e.g., gabapentin, pregabalin)
- Immunotherapy (e.g., rituximab, interferon, immunoglobulin)
- Naltrexone (low-dose)
- Sleep aids (e.g., antihistamines, orexin receptor antagonists, Z-drugs, benzodiazepines, trazodone, melatonin)
- Stimulants (e.g., amphetamine, lisdexamfetamine, methylphenidate)
- Sympathomimetics (e.g., phenylephrine)
- Vitamins, minerals, and dietary supplements (e.g., NADH, coenzyme Q10, carnitine, omega fatty acids, magnesium, vitamin B_{12})
- Wakefulness-promoting agents (e.g., modafinil)

== See also ==
- List of investigational drugs
- List of investigational fatigue drugs
- List of investigational long COVID drugs
- List of investigational fibromyalgia drugs
- List of investigational orthostatic intolerance drugs
- Management of ME/CFS
