= Bocidelpar =

Clinical data
- Other names: ASP-0367; ASP0367; MA-0211; MA0211; MTB-1; MTB1
- Routes of administration: Oral
- Drug class: Peroxisome proliferator-activated receptor delta (PPARδ) agonist
- ATC code: None

Identifiers
- IUPAC name: (3R)-3-methyl-6-[2-[[5-methyl-2-[4-(trifluoromethyl)phenyl]imidazol-1-yl]methyl]phenoxy]hexanoic acid
- CAS Number: 2095128-20-2
- PubChem CID: 126752383
- DrugBank: DB16906
- ChemSpider: 115009398
- UNII: FKO8A7AD54
- KEGG: D12242
- ChEMBL: ChEMBL5095171
- PDB ligand: 1KF (PDBe, RCSB PDB)

Chemical and physical data
- Formula: C_{25}H_{27}F_{3}N_{2}O_{3}
- Molar mass: 460.497 g·mol^{−1}
- 3D model (JSmol): Interactive image
- SMILES: CC1=CN=C(N1CC2=CC=CC=C2OCCC[C@@H](C)CC(=O)O)C3=CC=C(C=C3)C(F)(F)F
- InChI: InChI=1S/C25H27F3N2O3/c1-17(14-23(31)32)6-5-13-33-22-8-4-3-7-20(22)16-30-18(2)15-29-24(30)19-9-11-21(12-10-19)25(26,27)28/h3-4,7-12,15,17H,5-6,13-14,16H2,1-2H3,(H,31,32)/t17-/m1/s1; Key:FMOPHFSPINWSOV-QGZVFWFLSA-N

Bocidelpar (INN, USAN; developmental code names ASP-0367, MA-0211, and MTB-1) is a peroxisome proliferator-activated receptor delta (PPARδ) agonist which is or was under development for the treatment of mitochondrial myopathies, myalgic encephalomyelitis/chronic fatigue syndrome (ME/CFS), Duchenne muscular dystrophy, and metabolic disorders. It is taken orally.

The clinical pharmacodynamics and pharmacokinetics of bocidelpar have been studied.

Bocidelpar was originated by Mitobridge and is under development by Astellas Pharma and Mitobridge. As of February 2026, bocidelpar is in phase 2/3 clinical trials for mitochondrial myopathies and phase 2 trials for ME/CFS, whereas no recent development has been reported for Duchenne muscular dystrophy or metabolic disorders. However, other sources state that bocidelpar has been discontinued. The drug was also under development for the treatment of hypoxia, but development for this indication was discontinued. A phase 2 trial for mitochondrial myopathies was terminated due to lack of effectiveness.

== See also ==
- List of investigational ME/CFS drugs
