= Deoxyribozyme =

DNA oligonucleotides that can perform a specific chemical reaction

Deoxyribozymes, also called DNA enzymes, DNAzymes, or catalytic DNA, are DNA oligonucleotides that are capable of performing a specific chemical reaction, often but not always catalytic. This is similar to the action of other biological enzymes, such as proteins or ribozymes (enzymes composed of RNA). However, in contrast to the abundance of protein enzymes in biological systems and the discovery of biological ribozymes in the 1980s, there is only little evidence for naturally occurring deoxyribozymes. Deoxyribozymes should not be confused with DNA aptamers which are oligonucleotides that selectively bind a target ligand, but do not catalyze a subsequent chemical reaction.

With the exception of ribozymes, nucleic acid molecules within cells primarily serve as storage of genetic information due to its ability to form complementary base pairs, which allows for high-fidelity copying and transfer of genetic information. In contrast, nucleic acid molecules are more limited in their catalytic ability, in comparison to protein enzymes, to just three types of interactions: hydrogen bonding, pi stacking, and metal-ion coordination. This is due to the limited number of functional groups of the nucleic acid monomers: while proteins are built from up to twenty different amino acids with various functional groups, nucleic acids are built from just four chemically similar nucleobases. In addition, DNA lacks the 2'-hydroxyl group found in RNA which limits the catalytic competency of deoxyribozymes even in comparison to ribozymes.

In addition to the inherent inferiority of DNA catalytic activity, the apparent lack of naturally occurring deoxyribozymes may also be due to the primarily double-stranded conformation of DNA in biological systems which would limit its physical flexibility and ability to form tertiary structures, and so would drastically limit the ability of double-stranded DNA to act as a catalyst; though there are a few known instances of biological single-stranded DNA such as multicopy single-stranded DNA (msDNA), certain viral genomes, and the replication fork formed during DNA replication. Further structural differences between DNA and RNA may also play a role in the lack of biological deoxyribozymes, such as the additional methyl group of the DNA base thymidine compared to the RNA base uracil or the tendency of DNA to adopt the B-form helix while RNA tends to adopt the A-form helix. However, it has also been shown that DNA can form structures that RNA cannot, which suggests that, though there are differences in structures that each can form, neither is inherently more or less catalytic due to their possible structural motifs.

In 2021, the DNAmoreDB database for cataloguing known deoxyribozymes was released.

== Types ==
=== Ribonucleases ===
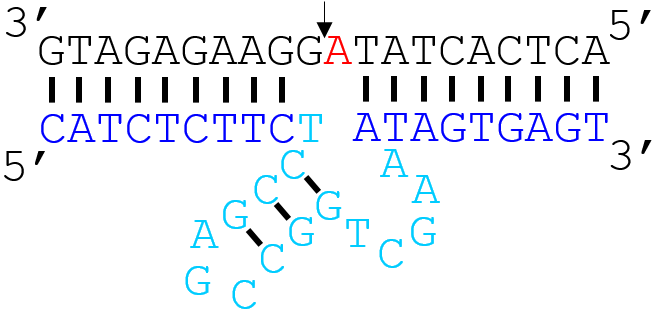
The trans-form (two separate strands) of the 17E DNAzyme. Most ribonuclease DNAzymes have a similar form, consisting of a separate enzyme strand (blue/cyan) and substrate strand (black). Two arms of complementary bases flank the catalytic core (cyan) on the enzyme strand and the single ribonucleotide (red) on the substrate strand. The arrow shows the ribonucleotide cleavage site.

The most abundant class of deoxyribozymes are ribonucleases, which catalyze the cleavage of a ribonucleotide phosphodiester bond through a transesterification reaction, forming a 2'3'-cyclic phosphate terminus and a 5'-hydroxyl terminus. Ribonuclease deoxyribozymes are selected as long single-stranded oligonucleotides capable of recognizing a single ribonucleotide within the target RNA molecule or substrate as the cleavage site. Following enzyme sequencing, these single-stranded deoxyribozymes can be exposed to their RNA substrate and, through a series of binding arms, hybridize to the target molecule via Watson-Crick hydrogen bonds, adopting a trans configuration (in this trans configuration, one strand is the DNAzyme, which possesses binding arms and catalytic core(s) or loop(s), while the other strand is the RNA molecule containing the cleavage site).

The first known deoxyribozyme was a ribonuclease, discovered in 1994 by Ronald Breaker while a postdoctoral fellow in the laboratory of Gerald Joyce at the Scripps Research Institute. This deoxyribozyme, later named GR-5, catalyzes the Pb^{2+}-dependent cleavage of a single ribonucleotide phosphoester at a rate that is more than 100-fold compared to the uncatalyzed reaction. Subsequently, additional RNA-cleaving deoxyribozymes that incorporate different metal cofactors were developed, including the Mg^{2+}-dependent E2 deoxyribozyme and the Ca^{2+}-dependent Mg5 deoxyribozyme. These first deoxyribozymes were unable to catalyze a full RNA substrate strand, but by incorporating the full RNA substrate strand into the selection process, deoxyribozymes which functioned with substrates consisting of either full RNA or full DNA with a single RNA base were both able to be utilized. The first of these more versatile deoxyribozymes, 8-17 and 10–23, are currently the most widely studied deoxyribozymes. In fact, many subsequently discovered deoxyribozymes were found to contain the same catalytic core motif as 8–17, including the previously discovered Mg5, suggesting that this motif represents the "simplest solution for the RNA cleavage problem". The 10-23 DNAzyme contains a 15-nucleotide catalytic core that is flanked by two substrate recognition domains. This DNAzyme cleaves complementary RNAs efficiently in a sequence specific manner between an unpaired purine and a paired pyrimidine. DNAzymes targeting AU or GU vs. GC or AC are more effective. Furthermore, the RNA cleavage rates have been shown to increase after the introduction of intercalators or the substitution of deoxyguanine with deoxyinosine at the junction of the catalytic loop. Specifically, the addition of 2'-O-methyl modifications to the catalytic proved to significantly increase the cleavage rate both in vitro and in vivo. Additionally, recent studies have focused on unraveling their kinetics to further understand their performance. Other notable deoxyribozyme ribonucleases are those that are highly selective for a certain cofactor. Among this group are the metal selective deoxyribozymes such as Pb^{2+}-specific 17E, UO_{2}^{2+}-specific 39E, and Na^{+}-specific A43. First crystal structure of a DNAzyme was reported in 2016. 10-23 core based DNAzymes and the respective MNAzymes that catalyse reactions at ambient temperatures were described in 2018 and open doors for use of these nucleic acid based enzymes for many other applications without the need for heating.

A DNA molecule with sequence 5'-GGAGAACGCGAGGCAAGGCTGGGAGAAATGTGGATCACGATT-3' acts as a deoxyribozyme that uses light to repair a thymine dimer, using serotonin as cofactor.

=== RNA ligases ===
Of particular interest are DNA ligases. These molecules have demonstrated remarkable chemoselectivity in RNA branching reactions. Although each repeating unit in a RNA strand owns a free hydroxyl group, the DNA ligase takes just one of them as a branching starting point. This cannot be done with traditional organic chemistry.

=== Other reactions ===
Many other deoxyribozymes have since been developed that catalyze DNA phosphorylation, DNA adenylation, DNA deglycosylation, porphyrin metalation, thymine dimer photoreversion and DNA cleavage.

== Methods ==
=== in vitro selection ===
Because there are no known naturally occurring deoxyribozymes, most known deoxyribozyme sequences have been discovered through a high-throughput in vitro selection technique, similar to SELEX. in vitro selection utilizes a "pool" of a large number of random DNA sequences (typically 10^{14}–10^{15} unique strands) that can be screened for a specific catalytic activity. The pool is synthesized through solid phase synthesis such that each strand has two constant regions (primer binding sites for PCR amplification) flanking a random region of a certain length, typically 25–50 bases long. Thus the total number of unique strands, called the sequence space, is 4^{N} where N denotes the number of bases in the random region. Because 4^{25} ≈ 10^{15}, there is no practical reason to choose random regions of less than 25 bases in length, while going above this number of bases means that the total sequence space cannot be surveyed. However, since there are likely many potential candidates for a given catalytic reaction within the sequence space, random regions of 50 and even higher have successfully yielded catalytic deoxyribozymes.

The pool is first subjected to a selection step, during which the catalytic strands are separated from the non-catalytic strands. The exact separation method will depend on the reaction being catalyzed. As an example, the separation step for ribonucleotide cleavage often utilizes affinity chromatography, in which a biological tag attached to each DNA strand is removed from any catalytically active strands via cleavage of a ribonucleotide base. This allows the catalytic strands to be separated by a column that specifically binds the tag, since the non-active strands will remain bound to the column while the active strands (which no longer possess the tag) flow through. A common set-up for this is a biotin tag with a streptavidin affinity column. Gel electrophoresis based separation can also be used in which the change in molecular weight of strands upon the cleavage reaction is enough to cause a shift in the location of the reactive strands on the gel. After the selection step, the reactive pool is amplified via polymerase chain reaction (PCR) to regenerate and amplify the reactive strands, and the process is repeated until a pool of sufficient reactivity is obtained. Multiple rounds of selection are required because some non-catalytic strands will inevitably make it through any single selection step. Usually 4–10 rounds are required for unambiguous catalytic activity, though more rounds are often necessary for more stringent catalytic conditions. After a sufficient number of rounds, the final pool is sequenced and the individual strands are tested for their catalytic activity. The dynamics of the pool can be described through mathematical modeling, which shows how oligonucleotides undergo competitive binding with the targets and how the evolutionary outcome can be improved through fine tuning of parameters.

Deoxyribozymes obtained through in vitro selection will be optimized for the conditions during the selection, such as salt concentration, pH, and the presence of cofactors. Because of this, catalytic activity only in the presence of specific cofactors or other conditions can be achieved using positive selection steps, as well as negative selection steps against other undesired conditions.

=== in vitro evolution ===
A similar method of obtaining new deoxyribozymes is through in vitro evolution. Though this term is often used interchangeably with in vitro selection, in vitro evolution more appropriately refers to a slightly different procedure in which the initial oligonucleotide pool is genetically altered over subsequent rounds through genetic recombination or through point mutations. For point mutations, the pool can be amplified using error-prone PCR to produce many different strands of various random, single mutations. As with in vitro selection, the evolved strands with increased activity will tend to dominate the pool after multiple selection steps, and once a sufficient catalytic activity is reached, the pool can be sequenced to identify the most active strands.

The initial pool for in vitro evolution can be derived from a narrowed subset of sequence space, such as a certain round of an in vitro selection experiment, which is sometimes also called in vitro reselection. The initial pool can also be derived from amplification of a single oligonucleotide strand. As an example of the latter, a recent study showed that a functional deoxyribozyme can be selected through in vitro evolution of a non-catalytic oligonucleotide precursor strand. An arbitrarily chosen DNA fragment derived from the mRNA transcript of bovine serum albumin was evolved through random point mutations over 25 rounds of selection. Through deep sequencing analysis of various pool generations, the evolution of the most catalytic deoxyribozyme strand could be tracked through each subsequent single mutation. This first successful evolution of catalytic DNA from a non-catalytic precursor could provide support for the RNA World hypothesis. In another recent study, an RNA ligase ribozyme was converted into a deoxyribozyme through in vitro evolution of the inactive deoxyribo-analog of the ribozyme. The new RNA ligase deoxyribozyme contained just twelve point mutations, two of which had no effect on activity, and had a catalytic efficiency of approximately 1/10 of the original ribozyme, though the researches hypothesized that the activity could be further increased through further selection. This first evidence for transfer of function between different nucleic acids could provide support for various pre-RNA World hypotheses.

== Applications ==
Although RNA enzymes were discovered before DNA enzymes, the latter have some distinct advantages. DNA is more cost-effective, and DNA can be made with longer sequence length and can be made with higher purity in solid-phase synthesis. Several studies have shown the usage of DNAzymes to inhibit influenza A and B virus replication in host cells. DNAzymes have also been shown to inhibit the replication of SARS coronavirus (SARS-CoV), Respiratory syncytial virus (RSV), human rhinovirus 14 and HCV

=== Drug clinical trials ===
Asthma is characterized by eosinophil-induced inflammation motivated by a type 2 helper T cell (Th2). By targeting the transcription factor, GATA3, of the Th2 pathway, with DNAzyme it may be possible to negate the inflammation. The safety and efficacy of SB010, a novel 10-23 DNAzyme was evaluated, and found to have the ability to cleave and inactivate GATA3 messenger RNA in phase IIa clinical trials. Treatment with SB010 significantly offset both late and early asthmatic responses after allergen aggravation in male patients with allergic asthma. The transcription factor GATA-3 is also an interesting target, of the DNAzyme topical formulation SB012, for a novel therapeutic strategy in ulcerative colitis (UC). UC is an idiopathic inflammatory bowel diseases defined by chronically relapsing inflammations of the gastrointestinal tract, and characterized by a superficial, continuous mucosal inflammation, which predominantly affects the large intestine. Patients that do not effectively respond to current UC treatment strategies exhibit serious drawbacks one of which may lead to colorectal surgery, and can result in a severely compromised quality of life. Thus, patients with moderate or severe UC may significantly benefit from these new therapeutic alternatives, of which SB012 is in phase I clinical trials. Atopic dermatitis (AD) is a chronic inflammatory skin disorder, in which patients suffer from eczema, often severe pruritus on the affected skin, as well as complications and secondary infections. AD surfaces from an upregulation of Th2-modified immune responses, therefore a novel AD approach using DNAzymes targeting GATA-3 is a plausible treatment option. The topical DNAzyme SB011 is currently in phase II clinical trials. DNAzyme research for the treatment of cancer is also underway. The development of a 10-23 DNAzyme that can block the expression of IGF-I (Insulin-like growth factor I, a contributor to normal cell growth as well as tumorigenesis) by targeting its mRNA could be useful for blocking the secretion of IGF-I from primary prostate stromal cells ultimately inhibiting prostate tumor development. Additionally, with this treatment it is expected that hepatic metastasis would also be inhibited, via the inhibition of IGF-I in the liver (the major source of serum IGF-I).

=== Sensors ===
DNAzymes have found practical use in metal biosensors. A DNAzyme based biosensor for lead ion was used to detect lead ion in water in St. Paul Public Schools in Minnesota. Furthermore, DNAzymes have been used in combination of aptamers and nucleic acid bioreceptors for the development of a multiplex bioassay.

=== Asymmetric synthesis ===
Chirality is another property that a DNAzyme can exploit. DNA occurs in nature as a right-handed double helix and in asymmetric synthesis a chiral catalyst is a valuable tool in the synthesis of chiral molecules from an achiral source. In one application an artificial DNA catalyst was prepared by attaching a copper ion to it through a spacer. The copper - DNA complex catalysed a Diels-Alder reaction in water between cyclopentadiene and an aza chalcone. The reaction products (endo and exo) were found to be present in an enantiomeric excess of 50%. Later it was found that an enantiomeric excess of 99% could be induced, and that both the rate and the enantioselectivity were related to the DNA sequence.

=== Bioconjugation with hGQ DNAzyme ===
The hemin/G-Quadruplex DNAzyme consists of G-Quadruplex forming DNA that can bind the co-factor hemin (a.k.a. Fe(III)Protoporphyrin IX), forming a complex that can perform certain oxidation reaction in the presence of hydrogen peroxide. This DNAzyme can oxidize small molecules, such as dopamine and adenosine triphosphate, but can also be used for the modification of peptides and proteins by attaching small molecules.

=== Other uses ===
Other uses of DNA in chemistry are in DNA-templated synthesis, Enantioselective catalysis, DNA nanowires and DNA computing.

== See also ==
- Aptamer – Oligonucleotide or peptide molecules that bind specific targets
- Ribozyme – Type of RNA molecules
- Systematic evolution of ligands by exponential enrichment (SELEX) – Technique for producing oligonucleotides that specifically bind to a target
