= List of investigational fatigue drugs =

Investigational fatigue drugs

This is a list of investigational fatigue drugs, or drugs that are currently under development for clinical use for the treatment of fatigue but are not yet approved.

This list includes drugs for idiopathic or general fatigue and/or for fatigue related to medical conditions such as depression, cancer, autoimmune diseases, neurodegenerative diseases, stroke, and traumatic brain injury. This list does not include investigational drugs for myalgic encephalomyelitis/chronic fatigue syndrome (ME/CFS) or long COVID, which can instead be found here and here, respectively.

Chemical/generic names are listed first, with developmental code names, synonyms, and brand names in parentheses. The format of list items is "Name (Synonyms) – Mechanism of Action [Reference]".

This list was last comprehensively updated in September 2025. It is likely to become outdated with time.

== Under development ==
=== Phase 2 ===
- Anamorelin (Adlumiz; ANAM; ONO-7643; RC-1291; ST-1291) – ghrelin receptor agonist
- Anhydrous enol oxaloacetate (AEO; oxaloacetate) – oxaloacetate replacement
- BP-1.3656B (BP13656) – histamine H_{3} receptor antagonist
- Laromestrocel (Lomecel-B; Longeveron human mesenchymal stem cells; LMSC) – cell replacement
- Reparixin (DF-1681Y; Repertaxin) – CXC chemokine receptor CXCR1 and CXCR2 negative allosteric modulator

=== Phase 1 ===
- Coacillium (LH-10; LH-4; LH-8) – various actions

=== Preclinical ===
- AVA-291 – androgen (androgen receptor agonist)
- DAT inhibitor therapeutic – dopamine reuptake inhibitor

== Not under development ==
=== Suspended ===
- Clazakizumab (ALD-518; Anti-IL-6 mAb; BMS-945429; CSL-300) – monoclonal antibody against interleukin-6

=== No development reported ===
- MRZ-9547 ((R)-phenylpiracetam, (R)-phenotropil, or (R)-fonturacetam) – atypical dopamine reuptake inhibitor

=== Discontinued ===
- Armodafinil (CEP-10953; Nuvigil; (R)-modafinil) – atypical dopamine reuptake inhibitor
- Levacecarnine (acetyl-L-carnitine; ALC; ALCAR; Branigen; L-acetylcarnitine; Nicetile; RO-447190; ST-200; ST-211; Zibren) – carnitine acetyltransferase stimulant

== Clinically used drugs ==
=== Approved drugs ===
- None

=== Off-label drugs ===
- Acetylcholinesterase inhibitors (e.g., donepezil)
- Adenosine receptor antagonists (e.g., caffeine, istradefylline, preladenant)
- Amantadine (Symmetrel)
- Antidepressants (e.g., SSRIs, TCAs)
- Bupropion (Wellbutrin)
- Carnitine
- Corticosteroids (e.g., prednisolone, dexamethasone, methylprednisolone)
- Dopamine precursors (e.g., levodopa)
- MAO-B inhibitors (e.g., rasagiline, selegiline)
- Monoclonal antibodies (e.g., adalimumab, infliximab, golimumab, sarilumab, tocilizumab, secukinumab)
- Norepinephrine reuptake inhibitors (NRIs) (e.g., atomoxetine)
- Protein kinase inhibitors (e.g., baricitinib, tofacitinib)
- Stimulants (e.g., amphetamine, lisdexamfetamine, methylphenidate, pemoline)
- Wakefulness-promoting agents (e.g., modafinil, armodafinil)

== See also ==
- List of investigational drugs
- List of investigational ME/CFS drugs
- List of investigational long COVID drugs
- Motivation-enhancing drug
