= Gerald Joyce =

American biochemist

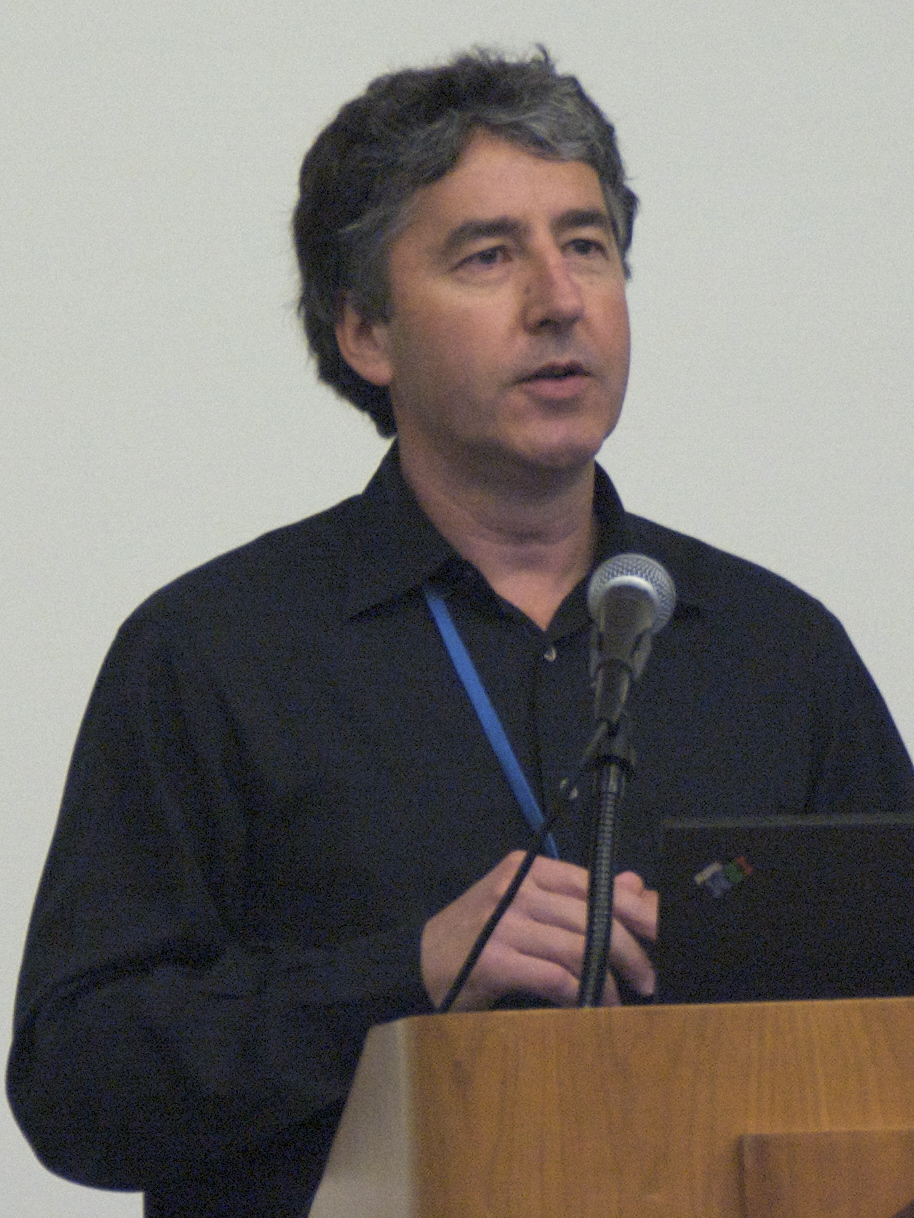
- Born: 1956 (age 69–70); Kansas, U.S.
- Education: University of Chicago; University of California, San Diego
- Spouse: Nancy McTigue
- Scientific career
- Workplaces: Salk Institute for Biological Studies; The Scripps Research Institute
- Website: www.salk.edu/scientist/gerald-joyce/

Gerald Francis "Jerry" Joyce (born 1956) is an American physician who is the president and a professor at the Salk Institute for Biological Studies and was previously the director of the Genomics Institute of the Novartis Research Foundation. He is best known for his work on in vitro evolution, for the discovery of the first DNA enzyme (deoxyribozyme), for his work in discovering potential RNA world ribozymes, and more in general for his work on the origin of life. In 2026, he was elected to the American Philosophical Society.

== Biography ==
Joyce was born in Kansas and grew up in Chicago, where he first became interested in science. His mother was a grade-school teacher, father was a business executive, and maternal grandfather was an Italian immigrant with a Ph.D. in engineering, whom Joyce credits for providing him with a "science gene." Inspired by novelist Thomas Pynchon, Joyce became curious about the natural processes that enable Darwinian Evolution and began to focus on biochemistry and molecular genetics in high school.

Joyce decided to pursue both medical and doctoral degrees, so that his future did not hinge on a successful career as a Darwinian engineer. As of 2022, Joyce says he still keeps his medical license up-to-date, despite working primarily as a researcher at Salk Institute.

Between graduating with his M.D. and Ph.D. in 1984 and launching his own research program in 1989, Joyce married his wife, psychiatrist Nancy McTigue, in the Salk Institute courtyard.

== Education ==
Joyce received his Bachelor of Arts from the University of Chicago in 1978, then completed his M.D. and Ph.D. at the University of California, San Diego in 1984. He was a postdoctoral fellow and senior research associate at the Salk Institute from 1985 to 1989, and joined the faculty at Scripps Research in 1989. ed his postgraduate medical training at Mercy Hospital in San Diego in 1984, and his postdoctoral research training at the Salk Institute from 1985 to 1989.

== Career and research ==
When he first joined the Salk Institute in 1985, Joyce worked under prominent RNA world researcher Leslie Orgel.

He was a professor at The Scripps Research Institute until 2017 and served as their dean of the faculty from 2006 to 2011, during which time he was instrumental in founding a second campus in Jupiter, Florida. Joyce has served as the chair of the JASON advisory group, which he joined in 1996. Joyce also served as the institute director of the Genomics Institute of the Novartis Research Foundation. In 2017, Joyce returned to the Salk Institute as a professor, where he then became chief science officer in 2022 and president in 2023.

In 2009, Joyce's lab was the first to produce a self-replicating in vitro system, capable of exponential growth and continuing evolution, composed entirely of RNA enzymes.

== Awards ==
- NAS Award in Molecular Biology, 1994
- Pfizer Award in Enzyme Chemistry, 1995
- JASON (advisory group), 1996
- Herbert W. Dickerman Award, 1997
- Hans Sigrist Prize, 1997
- National Academy of Sciences Member, 2001
- International Society for the Study of the Origin of Life (ISSOL) H. C. Urey Award, 2005
- Dannie Heineman Prize, 2009
- Stanley Miller Medal, 2010
- American Academy of Arts and Sciences Member, 2012
- National Academy of Medicine Member, 2014
- Harvard Origins Prize, Harvard University, 2016
- American Association for the Advancement of Science Fellow, 2017
- Royal Swedish Academy of Sciences Foreign Member, 2019
- Royal Irish Academy honorary member, 2024
