= ETX-155 =

Clinical data
- Other names: ETX155
- Routes of administration: Oral
- Drug class: GABA_{A} receptor positive allosteric modulator; Neurosteroid

Pharmacokinetic data
- Elimination half-life: 24–40 hours

ETX-155 is a GABA_{A} receptor positive allosteric modulator and neurosteroid which is or was under development for the treatment of depressive disorders, seizures, and fibromyalgia. It is taken orally and has an elimination half-life of 24 to 40 hours. The drug produces antidepressant-like, anxiolytic-like, and anticonvulsant effects in rodents. Side effects of ETX-155 in humans include somnolence, fatigue, dizziness, and headache. ETX-155 was originated by Athenen Therapeutics and is or was under development by Climb Bio and/or Eliem Therapeutics. As of October 2024, development of the drug for all indications has been suspended or discontinued. It reached phase 1 clinical trials prior to the suspension or discontinuation of its development.

== See also ==
- List of investigational antidepressants
- List of investigational fibromyalgia drugs
