= SMiLE-Seq =

Selective microfluidics-based ligand enrichment followed by sequencing (SMiLE-seq) is a technique developed for the rapid identification of DNA binding specificities and affinities of full length monomeric and dimeric transcription factors in a fast and semi-high-throughput fashion.

SMiLE-seq works by loading in vitro transcribed and translated “bait” transcription factors into a microfluidic device in combination with DNA molecules. Bound transcription factor-DNA complexes are then isolated from the device, which is followed by sequencing and then sequence data analysis to characterize binding motifs. Specialized software is used to determine the DNA binding properties of monomeric or dimeric transcription factors to help predict their in vivo DNA binding activity.

SMiLE-seq combines three important functions differing from existing techniques: (1) The use of capillary pumps to optimize the loading of samples, (2) Trapping molecular interactions on the surface of the microfluidic device through immunocapture of target transcription factors, (3) Enabling the selection of DNA that is specifically bound to transcription factors from a pool of random DNA sequences.

== Background ==
Elucidating the regulatory mechanisms used to govern essential cellular processes is an important branch of research. Cellular regulatory networks can be very complex and often involve the coordination of multiple processes that begin with the modulation of gene expression. The binding of transcription factor molecules to DNA, either alone or in combination with other transcription factors, is used to control gene expression in response to both intra- and extracellular stimuli.

Characterizing the binding mechanisms and specificities of transcription factors to specific regions of DNA – and identifying these transcription factors – is a fundamental component of the process of resolving cellular regulatory dynamics. Before the introduction of SMiLE-seq technology, ChIP-seq (chromatin immunoprecipitation sequencing) and HT-SELEX (high throughput systematic evolution of ligands by exponential enrichment) technologies were used to successfully characterize nearly 500 transcription factor-DNA binding interactions.

- ChIP-seq uses immunoprecipitation to isolate specific transcription factors bound to DNA fragments. Immunoprecipitation is followed by DNA sequencing, which identifies the genomic regions to which transcription factors bind.
- HT-SELEX, a similar method, uses random, synthetically generated DNA molecules as bait for transcription factors in vitro. Sequence preferences and binding affinities are characterized based on successful binding interactions between bait molecules and transcription factors.

It is estimated that fewer than 50% of the transcription factors present in humans have been described in previous techniques. The development of SMiLE-seq technology has provided an additional method with the potential to facilitate identification and characterization of previously undescribed transcription factor-DNA binding interactions.

== Workflow of SMiLE-seq ==
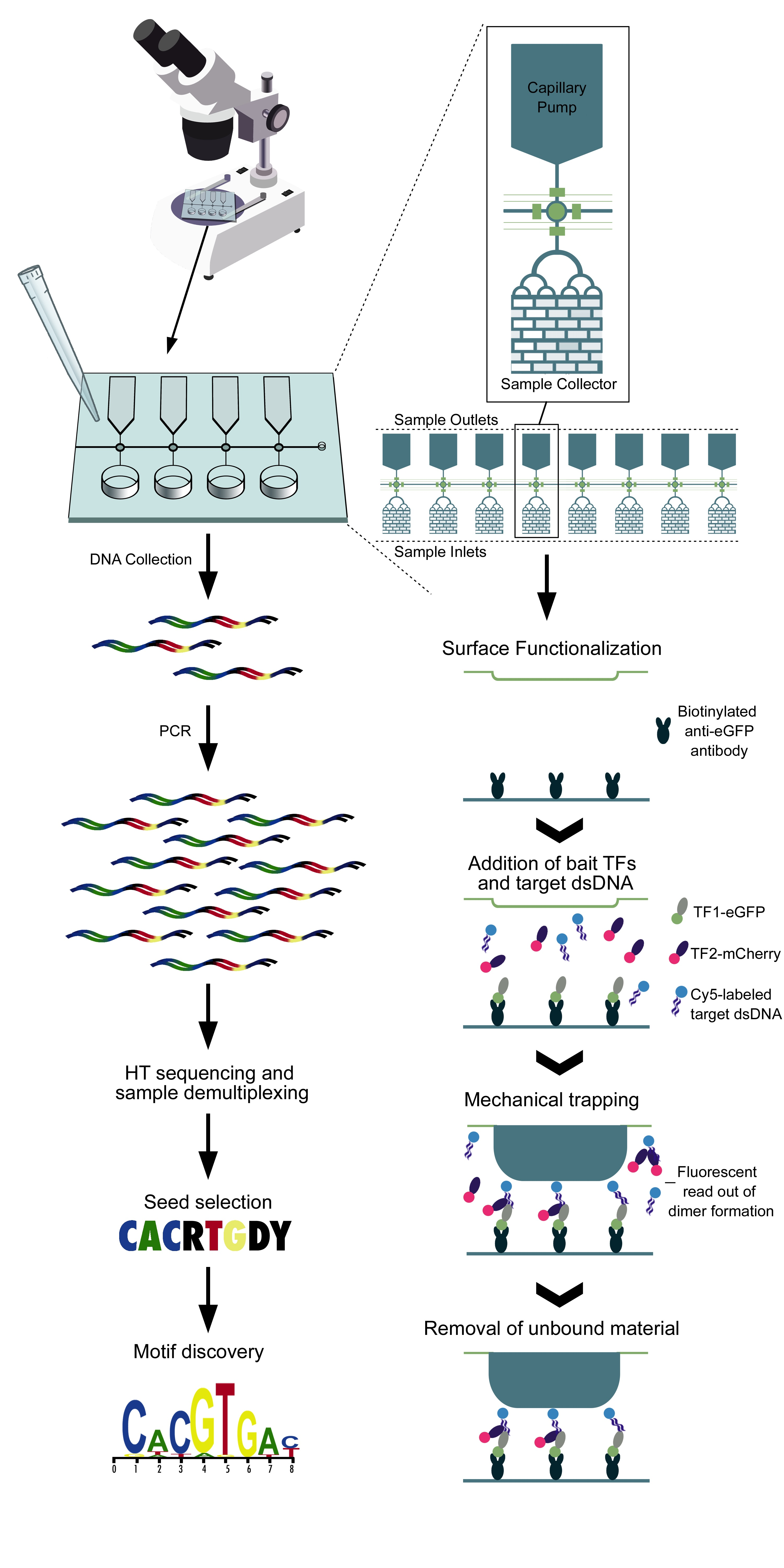
SMiLE-seq workflow

SMiLE-seq uses a microfluidic device into which transcription factors, which have been transcribed and translated in vitro, are loaded. Transcription factor samples (~0.3 ng) are modified by the addition of an enhanced green fluorescent protein (eGFP) tag and combined with both target double-stranded DNA molecules (~8 pmol) tagged with Cyanine Dye5 (Cy5) and a double-stranded competitive DNA model, poly-dIdC, which operates as a negative control to limit spurious binding interactions.

When multiple transcription factors are simultaneously analyzed (e.g., when characterization of potential heterodimeric binding interactions is performed), each transcription factor is tagged with a correspondingly unique fluorescent tag. Samples are pumped through the microfluidic device in a passive, twenty-minute process that utilizes capillary action in a series of parallel channels. eGFP-tagged transcription factors are immunocaptured using anchored biotinylated anti-eGFP antibodies.

Mechanical depression of a button traps bound transcription factor-DNA complexes, and fluorescent analysis is performed. Fluorescent readouts that identify the presence of multiple fluorescent tags associated with a single antibody indicate heterodimeric binding interactions. The presence of DNA is confirmed by Cy5 signal detection. A polydimethylsiloxane membrane on the button surface captures successfully bound transcription factor-DNA complexes, while unbound transcription factors and targets are washed away.

Following the removal of unbound components, bound DNA molecules are collected, pooled, and amplified. Sequencing is subsequently performed using NextSeq 500 or HiSeq2000 sequencing lanes. Sequence data is used to develop a seed sequence, which is then probed for functional motifs using a uniquely developed hidden Markov model-based software pipeline.

== Advantages ==
The use of microfluidics in SMiLE-seq offers three main advantages when compared to current techniques used to measure protein-DNA interactions (e.g., ChIP-seq, HT-SELEX, and protein binding microarrays).

- SMiLE-seg requires fewer transcription factors than other similar techniques (only picograms are required).
- The process is faster than other techniques (it requires less than an hour, as compared to days).
- SMiLE-seq is not limited by the length of target DNA (a limitation of protein binding microarrays), and is not biased towards stronger affinity protein-DNA interactions (a major limitation of HT-SELEX).

The ability of many transcription factors to bind DNA is dependent on heterodimer formation, and therefore requires the presence of a specific dimer partner for binding. This has been shown to yield incomplete results if transcription factors are individually tested. Heterodimer combinations have been shown to range from 3000 to 25000, and many remain uncharacterized.

A technology like SMiLE-seq, which is able to detect these dimeric interactions, may help broaden current knowledge and characterization of transcription factor-DNA binding profiles. Additionally, previous technologies have used transcription factor probes in their truncated form, which may reduce their ability to bind and dimerize. SMiLE-seq enables robust identification of DNA binding specificities of full length, previously uncharacterized transcription factors. Furthermore, SMiLE-seq is able to identify transcription factor binding sites over a wide range of binding affinities, which represents a significant limitation of other technologies.

== Limitations ==
The primary limitation of SMiLE-seq is that the technique can only be used to characterize the binding interactions of previously identified transcription factors, as the method requires in vitro transcription and translation of the transcription factors prior to their combination with DNA molecules. Additionally, previous studies have shown that fluorescent protein tags can affect the binding affinity of proteins to their targets.

The effect of the specific fluorescent protein tags on binding affinity would have to be investigated to determine whether this would impact specific protein-DNA interactions found using this technology. Further development of SMiLE-seq may involve modifying transcription factor expression conditions to increase the success of analysis.

== See also ==
- SELEX
- ChIP-seq
- Protein binding microarrays
- Competition-ChIP
