= List of investigational fibromyalgia drugs =

Investigational fibromyalgia drugs

This is a list of investigational fibromyalgia drugs, or drugs that are currently under development for clinical use in the treatment of fibromyalgia but are not yet approved.

Chemical/generic names are listed first, with developmental code names, synonyms, and brand names in parentheses. The format of list items is "Name (Synonyms) – Mechanism of Action [Reference]".

This list was last comprehensively updated in September 2025. It is likely to become outdated with time.

== Under development ==
=== Preregistration ===
- Esreboxetine ((S,S)-Reboxetine; AXS-14; PNU-165442G) – norepinephrine reuptake inhibitor (NRI)

=== Phase 3 ===
- Pregabalin controlled release (GRO-12; Lyrica CR; Pregabalin CR; Pregabalin ER) – gabapentinoid (α_{2}δ subunit-containing voltage-gated calcium channel ligand)

=== Phase 2 ===
- Celecoxib/famciclovir (famciclovir/celecoxib; IMC-1) – combination of celecoxib (COX inhibitor/NSAID) and famciclovir (antiviral)
- Mirtazapine (Avanza; Azamianserin; ME-2040; Mepirzapin; Norset; ORG-3770; Promyrtil; Reflex; Remergil; Remergon; Remeron; Rexer; Zispin) – tetracyclic antidepressant (TeCA) (non-selective monoamine receptor modulator and other actions)
- ONO-1110 – endocannabinoid synthesis regulator and indirect cannabinoid receptor modulator
- Opiranserin (Unafra; VVZ-000149; VVZ-149) – glycine transporter 2 (GlyT2) blocker, purine P2X_{3} receptor antagonist, and serotonin 5-HT_{2A} receptor antagonist
- Psilocybin (PFN™; TRP-8802; TRP-8803; TRP-8804; TRYP-0082) – non-selective serotonin receptor agonist and psychedelic hallucinogen
- Rozanolixizumab (Rystiggo; UCB-7665) – monoclonal antibody against neonatal Fc receptor (FcRn)

=== Research ===
- Celecoxib/valacyclovir (IMC-2; valacyclovir/celecoxib) – combination of celecoxib (COX inhibitor/NSAID) and valacyclovir (antiviral)

== Not under development ==
=== Suspended ===
- ETX-155 – GABA_{A} receptor positive allosteric modulator and neurosteroid

=== No development reported ===
- ASP-0819 (ASP0819) – calcium-activated potassium channel opener
- CT-38 – corticotropin-releasing factor CRF_{2} receptor agonist
- Elcubragistat (ABX-1431; Lu-AG06466) – monoacylglycerol lipase (MAGL) inhibitor
- Galcanezumab (Emgality; LY-2951742) – monoclonal antibody against calcitonin gene-related peptide (CGRP)
- Lacosamide (ADD-234037; Erlosamide; Harkoseride; SPM-927; SPM-929; Vimpat; Vimpato) – various actions
- Pregabalin controlled release (Pregabalin XR; Regabatin XR) – gabapentinoid (α_{2}δ subunit-containing voltage-gated calcium channel ligand)
- Research programme: cannabis extract therapeutics - Cannabis Science – cannabinoid receptor modulators
- Research programme: pregabalin gastric-retentive - ProTect (NPRx-1000; PRTT-200) – gabapentinoid (α_{2}δ subunit-containing voltage-gated calcium channel ligand)
- Ropinirole (Adartrel; Repreve; Requip) – dopamine D_{2}, D_{3}, and D_{4} receptor agonist
- SER-282 – undefined mechanism of action
- Somatropin (Nutrophin; Nutropin; SMP-140) – growth hormone (GH) replacement
- Sunobinop (IMB-115; IT-1315; RSC-117957; S-117957; V-117957) – nociceptin receptor agonist

=== Discontinued ===
- AD-337 – serotonin–norepinephrine reuptake inhibitor (SNRI)
- Ampreloxetine (TD-9855) – serotonin–norepinephrine reuptake inhibitor (SNRI)
- ASP-8062 – GABA_{B} receptor positive allosteric modulator
- Desvenlafaxine (DVS-233; MD-120; O-desmethylvenlafaxine; Pristiq; WY-45233) – serotonin–norepinephrine reuptake inhibitor (SNRI)
- Droxidopa (3,4-dihydroxyphenylserine; 3,4-threo-DOPS; DOPS; Northera; threo-DOPS) – norepinephrine precursor and indirect non-selective adrenergic receptor agonist
- Eslicarbazepine acetate (Aptiom; BIA 2-093; ESL; Exalief; SEP-0002093; SEP-2093; Stedesa; Zebinix) – sodium channel blocker
- Faxeladol (GRT-9906; GRT9906) – μ-opioid receptor (MOR) agonist and serotonin–norepinephrine reuptake inhibitor (SNRI) (tramadol analogue)
- Fremanezumab (Ajovy; LBR-101; PF-04427429; PF-4427429; RN-307; TEV-48125) – monoclonal antibody against calcitonin gene-related peptide (CGRP)
- Galantamine (galanthamine; GP-37267; Nivalin; R-113675; Razadyne; Reminyl) – acetylcholinesterase inhibitor
- Ibutamoren (L-163191; LUM-201; MK-0677; MK-677; Oratrope) – ghrelin receptor agonist and growth hormone secretagogue
- Interferon α2a (IFN-α lozenges; MOR-22; Veldona) – interferon α stimulant and immunomodulator
- Nabilone (Cesamet) – cannabinoid CB_{1} and CB_{2} receptor agonist
- PF-738502 – undefined mechanism of action
- Pramipexole (BI-Sifrol; Daquiran; Mirapex; Mirapexin; Pexola; Sifrol; SND-919; SND-919Y) – dopamine D_{2}, D_{3}, and D_{4} receptor agonist
- Pregabalin sustained release (EASOPSRTFP) – gabapentinoid (α_{2}δ subunit-containing voltage-gated calcium channel ligand)
- Radafaxine (GW-353162; (2S,3S)-hydroxybupropion) – norepinephrine–dopamine reuptake inhibitor (NDRI)
- Research programme: fibromyalgia therapies - Cypress Bioscience/Georgetown University – undefined mechanism of action
- Rotigotine transdermal (Leganto; N-0437; N-0923; Neupro; Nubrenza; SPM-962) – non-selective dopamine receptor agonist and other actions
- Sodium oxybate (γ-hydroxybutyrate; GHB; JZP-6; KEY-10; Xyrem) – GABA_{B} receptor agonist and GHB receptor agonist
- Terguride (Dironyl; Mysalfon; SH-406; Teluron; Transdihydrolisuride; VUFB-6638; ZK-31224) – non-selective dopamine receptor agonist, non-selective serotonin receptor modulator, and other actions
- Tizanidine (AN-021A; AN-021; DS-103282-CH; DS-103282; Sirdalud; Ternelin; Zanaflex) – α_{2}-adrenergic receptor agonist
- Ubidecarenone (Bio-Quinone Q10; Coenzyme Q10; CoQ10; Neuquinon; Q-Gel; UbiQGel; Ubiquinone; Vitaline) – antioxidant and immunomodulator
- ZYN-001 (δ^{9}-THC D-glyceric acid ester; THC prodrug transdermal patch) – cannabinoid CB_{1} and CB_{2} receptor agonist

== Clinically used drugs ==
=== Approved ===
- Cyclobenzaprine sublingual (KRL-102; TNX-102; Tonmya) – tricyclic antidepressant (TCA) (non-selective monoamine reuptake inhibitor and monoamine receptor modulator)
- Duloxetine (Ariclaim; Cymbalta; LY-227942; LY-248686; Xeristar; Yentreve) – serotonin–norepinephrine reuptake inhibitor (SNRI)
- Milnacipran (Dalcipran; F-2207; Impulsor; Ixel; Joncia; Midacipran; Midalcipran; Savella; TN-912; Toledomin) – serotonin–norepinephrine reuptake inhibitor (SNRI)
- Pregabalin (CI-1008; isobutylgaba; Lyrica; PD-144723) – gabapentinoid (α_{2}δ subunit-containing voltage-gated calcium channel ligand)

=== Off-label drugs ===
- Anticonvulsants (e.g., lacosamide)
- Cannabinoids (cannabinoid receptor modulators) (e.g., cannabis, tetrahydrocannabinol (THC), cannabidiol (CBD), nabilone)
- Capsaicin – transient receptor potential vanilloid receptor 1 (TRPV1) agonist
- Carisoprodol (Soma) – muscle relaxant
- Gabapentinoids (α_{2}δ subunit-containing voltage-gated calcium channel ligands) (e.g., gabapentin, gabapentin enacarbil, mirogabalin)
- Hypnotics (e.g., zolpidem)
- Melatonin – melatonin receptor agonist
- Monoamine oxidase inhibitors (MAOIs) (e.g., moclobemide, pirlindole)
- Non-steroidal anti-inflammatory drugs (NSAIDs) (e.g., ibuprofen, naproxen, aspirin)
- Paracetamol (acetaminophen) – analgesic
- Selective serotonin reuptake inhibitors (SSRIs) (e.g., citalopram, fluoxetine, paroxetine)
- Sodium oxybate (γ-hydroxybutyrate; GHB; Xyrem) – GABA_{B} receptor agonist and GHB receptor agonist
- Serotonin–norepinephrine reuptake inhibitors (SNRIs) (e.g., desvenlafaxine, levomilnacipran, venlafaxine)
- Tetracyclic antidepressants (TeCAs) (e.g., mirtazapine)
- Tizanidine (Zanaflex) – α_{2}-adrenergic receptor agonist
- Tramadol (Tramal) – weak μ-opioid receptor (MOR) agonist and serotonin–norepinephrine reuptake inhibitor (SNRI)
- Tricyclic antidepressants (TCAs) (e.g., amitriptyline)
- Tropisetron – serotonin 5-HT_{3} receptor antagonist

== See also ==
- Lists of investigational drugs
- List of investigational ME/CFS drugs
- List of investigational long COVID drugs
- List of investigational analgesics
