= Nuvelo =

Biopharmaceutical company

Nuvelo Inc. was a biopharmaceutical company engaged in the discovery, development and commercialization of drugs for acute cardiovascular disease, cancer and other debilitating medical conditions. On January 27, 2009, the company was acquired by ARCA Biopharma, Inc. in a reverse takeover transaction.

== The company ==
Nuvelo, Inc. was located at San Carlos, California and had approximately 250 employees. Corporate officers included chairman George Rathmann (founder and CEO of Amgen), CEO Ted Love, and executive vice president Michael Levy. The company's development pipeline included:

- Alfimeprase, a direct-acting fibrinolytic in Phase II development for the treatment of thrombotic-related disorders, including acute ischemic stroke and catheter occlusion.
- NU172, a direct thrombin inhibitor in Phase I development for use as a short-acting anticoagulant during medical or surgical procedures.
- rNAPc2, an anti-thrombin anticoagulant being developed for the treatment of thrombosis in metastatic colorectal carcinoma.
- NU206, a preclinical candidate for the treatment of chemotherapy and radiation therapy-induced mucositis and inflammatory bowel disease.

In addition, Nuvelo had research programs in leukemia therapeutic antibodies and Wnt signaling pathway therapeutics to expand its drug pipeline and create additional partnering and licensing opportunities.

== Start-up phase and core competency ==
Nuvelo was initially founded as Hyseq in August 1992 and based on DNA array technology. Hyseq's genomic platform was used to develop gene based therapeutics and diagnostics. At the rate of more than 1,000,000 human DNA samples analyzed per month during 1997, Hyseq was a large partial human gene sequence database with over 5,000,000 sequences. The HyX platform had five core technologies:

- Labeled DNA probes
- DNA arrays of samples and probes
- Software-driven modules like Gene Discovery, HyGnostics and HyChip
- Industrial robots to screen DNA probes
- Bioinformatics software for information management

== Transition towards therapeutics ==
Applications that were developed making use of the genomic platform included gene identification, expression analysis, polymorphism screening and diagnostic testing. The company strategy was to exploit this platform technology to enter gene discovery and to eventually produce therapeutic drugs.

This technology led to collaborations and partnerships with companies and academic institutions including Affymetrix, PerkinElmer, Aurora biosciences, Amgen, Genetastix, Agilent Technologies, Callida Genomics, Aspen Institute, University of California, San Francisco, Celera Diagnostics, Surromed, Variagenics, Sequenom, Archemix, Amgen and Bayer. The company also created revenue by out-licensing their technologies with other companies.

=== Partnerships ===
In the early days of Nuvelo, when they were called Hyseq, there was a great deal of partnering activity. This was due to their business model which centered on their high-throughput sequencing platform. The company simply partnered or licensed out any novel discovery that did not fall into their desired disease space. Listed below are some of the material collaborations that the company undertook.

==== Dendreon ====
Nuvelo obtained the worldwide rights for all indication of rNAPc2 and other rNAPc molecules owned by Dendreon Corporation. Dendreon was paid an upfront fee of $4.0 million with an additional $23.5 million if all development and commercialization milestones are achieved. In addition, royalty payments were structured.

==== Amgen ====
In October 2004, Nuvelo obtained the worldwide rights to develop and commercialize alfimeprase from Amgen in exchange for future payment to Amgen as negotiated under their initial deal.

==== Archemix ====
In January 2004, the company signed a 50/50 agreement with Archemix. In July 2006, the collaboration was expanded in that Archemix became responsible for the discovery of short-acting aptamers targeting coagulation cascade for use in acute cardiovascular procedures. Nuvelo was responsible for the development and commercialization of any products discovered.

==== Bayer ====
January 2006, Nuvelo partnered to develop Alfimeprase. Bayer was to commercialize the drug outside the United States. Nuvelo retained commercial rights in the United States market and was to receive ROW royalties ranging from 15% to 37.5%. The deal was structured with a $50 million upfront payment and milestone payments totaling $385 million ($165M in development milestones and $170M in sales and commercialization). Although many of these milestones were never achieved, in 2006 a total of $28.9M was billed to Bayer under their cost-sharing agreement.

In February 2003, Hyseq merged with Variagenics giving birth to “Nuvelo Inc.” to further development of drug “alfimeprase.” This drug therapy was developed against peripheral arterial occlusion or “Leg Attack” disease and was approved as orphan drug status. This accelerated the clinical development of alfimeprase.

== Merger ==
Early stage clinical trials for alfimeprase with NU206 (R-respondin protein) and NU172 (short acting thrombin inhibitor) were promising and were approved by the FDA. Bayer was collaborating with Nuvelo on late stage studies on alfimeprase. After Nuvelo's failure in these studies, Bayer closed the deal in June 2007. However, Nuvelo was optimistic and continued the trial with alfimeprase. However, in March 2008, Nuvelo's phase II trial failed to meet endpoints, thereby forcing Nuvelo to discontinue the trial. The company laid off forty employees and restructured the organization. Also, executive vice president Michael Levy left the company

Nuvelo's market cap reached a peak of approximately $US 1 billion in the lead up to alfimeprase phase 3 studies completion, but share price plummeted eventually to less than $1 and received notification from NASDAQ. Despite this, Nuvelo was able to show positive proof of concept for NU172 in August 2008. Following this, Nuvelo was merged with ARCA Biopharma Inc. on September 26, 2008, forming a late stage cardiovascular biotechnology company. ARCA biopharma focuses on developing genetically targeted cardiovascular therapies, with lead candidate drug Gencaro, a beta blocker and vaso-dilator. It was Nuvelo's genetically targeted technology and cardiovascular drug development that interested ARCA Biopharma in acquiring the company.

According to the merger agreement, Nuvelo issued new shares of its common stock to ARCA stockholders and assumed the outstanding options and warrants involved. Novelo CEO Ted Love took a seat on the board of the combined business and Arca CEO Richard Brewer became CEO of the new business. The option and warrant holders were expected to own 67% of the combined company's common stock and Nuvelo stockholders 33% of the new company.
