= ZYN-001 =

Clinical data
- Other names: ZYN001; Δ^{9}-Tetrahydrocannabinol D-glyceric acid ester; Δ^{9}-THC D-glyceric acid ester; Tetrahydrocannabinol prodrug; Tetrahydrocannabinol prodrug transdermal patch; THC prodrug; THC prodrug transdermal patch
- Routes of administration: Transdermal (patch)
- Drug class: Cannabinoid; Cannabinoid CB_{1} and CB_{2} receptor agonist

Identifiers
- IUPAC name: [(6aR,10aR)-6,6,9-trimethyl-3-pentyl-6a,7,8,10a-tetrahydrobenzo[c]chromen-1-yl] 2,3-dihydroxypropanoate
- CAS Number: 1159421-39-2
- PubChem CID: 153257813

Chemical and physical data
- Formula: C_{24}H_{34}O_{5}
- Molar mass: 402.531 g·mol^{−1}
- 3D model (JSmol): Interactive image
- SMILES: CCCCCC1=CC2=C([C@@H]3C=C(CC[C@H]3C(O2)(C)C)C)C(=C1)OC(=O)C(CO)O
- InChI: InChI=1S/C24H34O5/c1-5-6-7-8-16-12-20(28-23(27)19(26)14-25)22-17-11-15(2)9-10-18(17)24(3,4)29-21(22)13-16/h11-13,17-19,25-26H,5-10,14H2,1-4H3/t17-,18-,19?/m1/s1; Key:WUPURSKTAUGQRZ-PWCSWUJKSA-N

ZYN-001, also known as Δ^{9}-tetrahydrocannabinol D-glyceric acid ester, is a cannabinoid which was under development for the treatment of cancer pain, neuropathic pain, fibromyalgia, and Tourette's syndrome but was never marketed. It was formulated as a transdermal patch. The drug is a synthetic prodrug of Δ^{9}-tetrahydrocannabinol (Δ^{9}-THC) and acts as a cannabinoid CB_{1} and CB_{2} receptor agonist. ZYN-001 was under development by Zynerba Pharmaceuticals. It reached phase 1 clinical trials prior to the discontinuation of its development in 2018. The drug was discontinued after it failed to attain target THC blood levels of 5 to 15 ng/mL in a phase 1 trial.

== See also ==
- List of cannabinoids
- List of investigational fibromyalgia drugs
