= Asymmetric PCR =

Asymmetric PCR is a variation of PCR used to preferentially amplify one strand of the original DNA more than the other. The technique has applications in some types of sequencing and hybridization probing where having only one of the two complementary strands is required.

== Methodology ==
Asymmetric PCR differs from regular PCR by the excessive amount of primers for a chosen strand. Due to the slow (arithmetic) amplification later in the reaction (after the limiting primer has been used up) extra cycles of PCR are required.

A modification on this process, known as Linear-After-The-Exponential-PCR (LATE-PCR), uses a limiting primer with a higher melting temperature than the excess primer to maintain reaction efficiency as the limiting primer concentration decreases mid-reaction.

== Applications ==
Asymmetric PCR can be used to form single stranded DNA from double stranded DNA, which is then used for DNA sequencing in the mutagenesis method. Single stranded DNA is also important for aptamer generation.
