= BC-007 =

DNA-based experimental drug

BC-007 INN: Rovunaptabin

Clinical data
- Other names: ARC183, ARC-183; BC007, BC-007; GS522, GS-522; G15D; HD1; HTQ; ODN1, ODN-1; TBA; d(GGTTGGTGTGGTTGG); 5'-GGTTGGTGTGGTTGG-3'
- Routes of administration: Infusion

Pharmacokinetic data
- Elimination half-life: 2.9-11 min

Identifiers
- IUPAC name: [(2R,3S,5R)-5-(2-amino-6-oxo-1H-purin-9-yl)-2-[[[(2R,3S,5R)-2-[[[(2R,3S,5R)-2-[[[(2R,3S,5R)-5-(2-amino-6-oxo-1H-purin-9-yl)-2-[[[(2R,3S,5R)-5-(2-amino-6-oxo-1H-purin-9-yl)-2-[[[(2R,3S,5R)-2-[[[(2R,3S,5R)-5-(2-amino-6-oxo-1H-purin-9-yl)-2-[[[(2R,3S,5R)-2-[[[(2R,3S,5R)-5-(2-amino-6-oxo-1H-purin-9-yl)-2-[[[(2R,3S,5R)-5-(2-amino-6-oxo-1H-purin-9-yl)-2-[[[(2R,3S,5R)-2-[[[(2R,3S,5R)-2-[[[(2R,3S,5R)-5-(2-amino-6-oxo-1H-purin-9-yl)-2-[[[(2R,3S,5R)-5-(2-amino-6-oxo-1H-purin-9-yl)-2-(hydroxymethyl)oxolan-3-yl]oxy-hydroxyphosphoryl]oxymethyl]oxolan-3-yl]oxy-hydroxyphosphoryl]oxymethyl]-5-(5-methyl-2,4-dioxopyrimidin-1-yl)oxolan-3-yl]oxy-hydroxyphosphoryl]oxymethyl]-5-(5-methyl-2,4-dioxopyrimidin-1-yl)oxolan-3-yl]oxy-hydroxyphosphoryl]oxymethyl]oxolan-3-yl]oxy-hydroxyphosphoryl]oxymethyl]oxolan-3-yl]oxy-hydroxyphosphoryl]oxymethyl]-5-(5-methyl-2,4-dioxopyrimidin-1-yl)oxolan-3-yl]oxy-hydroxyphosphoryl]oxymethyl]oxolan-3-yl]oxy-hydroxyphosphoryl]oxymethyl]-5-(5-methyl-2,4-dioxopyrimidin-1-yl)oxolan-3-yl]oxy-hydroxyphosphoryl]oxymethyl]oxolan-3-yl]oxy-hydroxyphosphoryl]oxymethyl]oxolan-3-yl]oxy-hydroxyphosphoryl]oxymethyl]-5-(5-methyl-2,4-dioxopyrimidin-1-yl)oxolan-3-yl]oxy-hydroxyphosphoryl]oxymethyl]-5-(5-methyl-2,4-dioxopyrimidin-1-yl)oxolan-3-yl]oxy-hydroxyphosphoryl]oxymethyl]oxolan-3-yl] [(2R,3S,5R)-5-(2-amino-6-oxo-1H-purin-9-yl)-3-phosphonooxyoxolan-2-yl]methyl hydrogen phosphate
- CAS Number: 145563-68-4 (ARC183); 2136396-60-4
- PubChem CID: 134160274
- PubChem SID: 347909961
- DrugBank: DB05124
- ChemSpider: 88293979
- UNII: W2M77IR3S2
- ChEBI: CHEBI:140487

Chemical and physical data
- Formula: C_{150}H_{188}N_{57}O_{97}P_{15}
- Molar mass: 4806.062 g·mol^{−1}
- 3D model (JSmol): Interactive image
- SMILES: OC[C@H]1O[C@@H](N2C=3N=C(NC(C3N=C2)=O)N)C[C@@H]1OP(OC[C@H]4O[C@@H](N5C=6N=C(NC(C6N=C5)=O)N)C[C@@H]4OP(OC[C@H]7O[C@@H](N8C=C(C(NC8=O)=O)C)C[C@@H]7OP(OC[C@H]9O[C@@H](N%10C=C(C(NC%10=O)=O)C)C[C@@H]9OP(OC[C@H]%11O[C@@H](N%12C=%13N=C(NC(C%13N=C%12)=O)N)C[C@@H]%11OP(OC[C@H]%14O[C@@H](N%15C=%16N=C(NC(C%16N=C%15)=O)N)C[C@@H]%14OP(OC[C@H]%17O[C@@H](N%18C=C(C(NC%18=O)=O)C)C[C@@H]%17OP(OC[C@H]%19O[C@@H](N%20C=%21N=C(NC(C%21N=C%20)=O)N)C[C@@H]%19OP(OC[C@H]%22O[C@@H](N%23C=C(C(NC%23=O)=O)C)C[C@@H]%22OP(OC[C@H]%24O[C@@H](N%25C=%26N=C(NC(C%26N=C%25)=O)N)C[C@@H]%24OP(OC[C@H]%27O[C@@H](N%28C=%29N=C(NC(C%29N=C%28)=O)N)C[C@@H]%27OP(OC[C@H]%30O[C@@H](N%31C=C(C(NC%31=O)=O)C)C[C@@H]%30OP(OC[C@H]%32O[C@@H](N%33C=C(C(NC%33=O)=O)C)C[C@@H]%32OP(OC[C@H]%34O[C@@H](N%35C=%36N=C(NC(C%36N=C%35)=O)N)C[C@@H]%34OP(OC[C@H]%37O[C@@H](N%38C=%39N=C(NC(C%39N=C%38)=O)N)C[C@@H]%37OP(O)(=O)O)(=O)O)(=O)O)(=O)O)(=O)O)(=O)O)(=O)O)(=O)O)(=O)O)(=O)O)(=O)O)(=O)O)(=O)O)(=O)O)(=O)O
- InChI: InChI=1S/C150H188N57O97P15/c1-52-22-193(145(224)187-121(52)209)88-9-60(77(278-88)32-265-314(249,250)299-66-15-96(201-45-162-105-114(201)171-138(153)180-129(105)217)283-81(66)36-262-306(233,234)291-58-7-94(275-73(58)28-208)199-43-160-103-112(199)169-136(151)178-127(103)215)292-308(237,238)264-31-76-63(12-91(277-76)196-25-55(4)124(212)190-148(196)227)295-311(243,244)271-39-84-71(20-101(286-84)206-50-167-110-119(206)176-143(158)185-134(110)222)303-318(257,258)274-42-87-70(19-100(289-87)205-49-166-109-118(205)175-142(157)184-133(109)221)302-317(255,256)268-35-80-64(13-92(281-80)197-26-56(5)125(213)191-149(197)228)296-312(245,246)270-38-83-68(17-98(285-83)203-47-164-107-116(203)173-140(155)182-131(107)219)300-315(251,252)267-34-79-65(14-93(280-79)198-27-57(6)126(214)192-150(198)229)297-313(247,248)272-40-85-72(21-102(287-85)207-51-168-111-120(207)177-144(159)186-135(111)223)304-319(259,260)273-41-86-69(18-99(288-86)204-48-165-108-117(204)174-141(156)183-132(108)220)301-316(253,254)266-33-78-61(10-89(279-78)194-23-53(2)122(210)188-146(194)225)293-309(239,240)263-30-75-62(11-90(276-75)195-24-54(3)123(211)189-147(195)226)294-310(241,242)269-37-82-67(16-97(284-82)202-46-163-106-115(202)172-139(154)181-130(106)218)298-307(235,236)261-29-74-59(290-305(230,231)232)8-95(282-74)200-44-161-104-113(200)170-137(152)179-128(104)216/h22-27,43-51,58-102,208H,7-21,28-42H2,1-6H3,(H,233,234)(H,235,236)(H,237,238)(H,239,240)(H,241,242)(H,243,244)(H,245,246)(H,247,248)(H,249,250)(H,251,252)(H,253,254)(H,255,256)(H,257,258)(H,259,260)(H,187,209,224)(H,188,210,225)(H,189,211,226)(H,190,212,227)(H,191,213,228)(H,192,214,229)(H2,230,231,232)(H3,151,169,178,215)(H3,152,170,179,216)(H3,153,171,180,217)(H3,154,172,181,218)(H3,155,173,182,219)(H3,156,174,183,220)(H3,157,175,184,221)(H3,158,176,185,222)(H3,159,177,186,223)/t58-,59-,60-,61-,62-,63-,64-,65-,66-,67-,68-,69-,70-,71-,72-,73+,74+,75+,76+,77+,78+,79+,80+,81+,82+,83+,84+,85+,86+,87+,88+,89+,90+,91+,92+,93+,94+,95+,96+,97+,98+,99+,100+,101+,102+/m0/s1"CHEBI:140487 - 5'-GGTTGGTGTGGTTGG-3'". ChEBI. European Bioinformatics Institute. 2018-04-11.; Key:LADFAOKPINUFBB-TWPNXFTKSA-N

BC-007, whose international nonproprietary name is Rovunaptabin, is an oligonucleotide aptamer, a synthetic DNA compound designed to bind other chemicals. BC-007 is in early-stage clinical trials as a lead compound intended for the potential treatment of heart failure or long COVID.

== History ==
Since the 1990s, the binding of G protein coupled receptors to autoantibodies (GPCR-AABs) was investigated as a possible factor in the pathology of several diseases, including heart disease. In parallel, treatment strategies to remove GPCR-AABs were investigated, initially using proteins or peptides to bind the antibodies.

In 2012, scientists from the Max Delbrück Center and the Charité Heart Center obtained a patent in the United States for using aptamers as a therapy or diagnosis of autoimmune diseases. Beginning in 2013, the research group focused on the treatment of dilated cardiomyopathy in people positive for beta-1 adrenergic receptor autoantibodies. In 2015–16, scientists reported that two aptamers might bind and inhibit GPCR-AABs.

The biotechnology company Berlin Cures pursued the development of the aptamer with the nucleotide sequence GGT TGG TGT GGT TGG under the codename BC-007 for the inhibition of autoantibodies in cardiomyopathy.

== Properties ==
BC-007 is a 15-nucleotide single-stranded DNA molecule consisting of nine unmodified deoxy-guanosines and six corresponding deoxythymidines with the sequence 5'-GGT TGG TGT GGT TGG-3'. Its three-dimensional structure allows it to wrap around the target structure of G-protein-coupled receptor autoantibodies and neutralize their activity.

BC-007 is synthetic, enabling it to be produced in high volumes quickly. It is stable and suited for long-term storage. It has shown no side effects in early clinical studies, and does not trigger immunological responses. As it is water soluble, it can be formulated as inhalation or as nasal spray. In some human studies, it was given by intravenous infusion, displaying an in vivo half-life in blood of about 4 minutes.
