= Cross-linking immunoprecipitation =

Method used in molecular biology

Cross-linking and immunoprecipitation (CLIP, or CLIP-seq) is a method used in molecular biology that combines UV crosslinking with immunoprecipitation in order to identify RNA binding sites of proteins on a transcriptome-wide scale, thereby increasing our understanding of post-transcriptional regulatory networks. CLIP can be used either with antibodies against endogenous proteins, or with common peptide tags (including FLAG, V5, HA, and others) or affinity purification, which enables the possibility of profiling model organisms or RBPs otherwise lacking suitable antibodies.

== Workflow ==
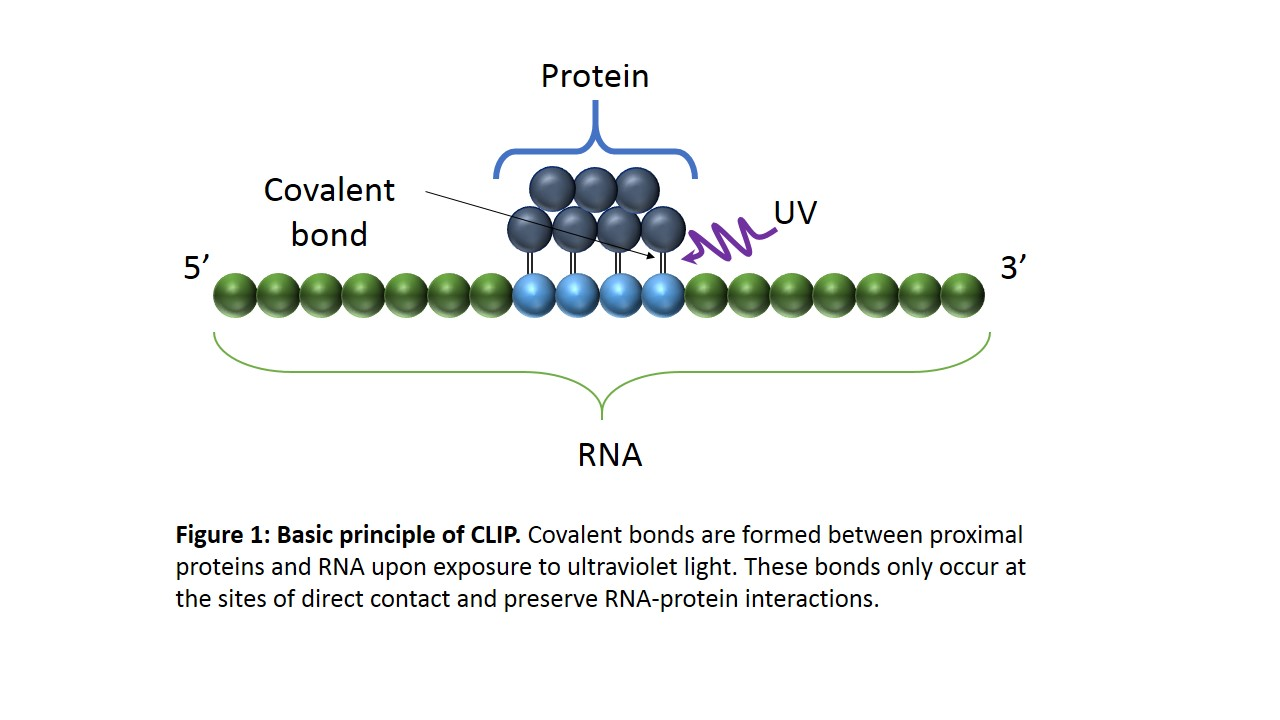
Basic Principle of CLIP

CLIP begins with the in vivo cross-linking of RNA-protein complexes using ultraviolet light (UV). Upon UV exposure, covalent bonds are formed between proteins and nucleic acids that are in close proximity (on the order of Angstroms apart). The cross-linked cells are then lysed, RNA is fragmented, and the protein of interest is isolated via immunoprecipitation. In order to allow for priming of reverse transcription, RNA adapters are ligated to the 3' ends, and RNA fragments are labelled to enable the analysis of the RNA-protein complexes after they have been separated from free RNA using gel electrophoresis and membrane transfer. Proteinase K digestion is then performed in order to remove protein from the crosslinked RNA, which leaves a few amino acids at the crosslink site. This often leads to truncation of cDNAs at the crosslinked nucleotide, which is exploited in variants such as iCLIP to increase the resolution of the method. cDNA is then synthesized via RT-PCR followed by high-throughput sequencing followed by mapping the reads back to the transcriptome and other computational analyses to study the interaction sites.

== History and applications ==
CLIP was originally undertaken to study interactions between the neuron-specific RNA-binding protein and splicing factors NOVA1 and NOVA2 in the mouse brain, identifying RNA binding sites that contained the expected Nova-binding motifs. Sequencing of the cDNA library identified many positions close to alternative exons, several of which were found to require Nova1/2 for their brains-specific splicing patterns. In 2008, CLIP was combined with high-throughput sequencing (termed "HITS-CLIP") to generate genome-wide protein-RNA interaction maps for Nova; since then a number of other RNA-binding proteins have been studied with CLIP, including PTBP1, RbFox2 (where it was referred to as "CLIP-seq"), SFRS1, Argonaute, hnRNP C, the Fragile-X mental retardation protein FMRP, Ptbp2 (in the mouse brain), Mbnl2, the nElavl proteins (the neuron-specific Hu proteins), and has been applied to RNA binding proteins from all kingdoms of life, including prokaryotes. CLIP analysis of the RNA-binding protein Argonaute led to identification of microRNA targets by decoding microRNA-mRNA and protein-RNA interaction maps in the mouse brain and subsequently in budding yeast (Saccharomyces cerevisiae), Caenorhabditis elegans, embryonic stem cells and tissue culture cells.

== Methods ==
=== HITS-CLIP ===
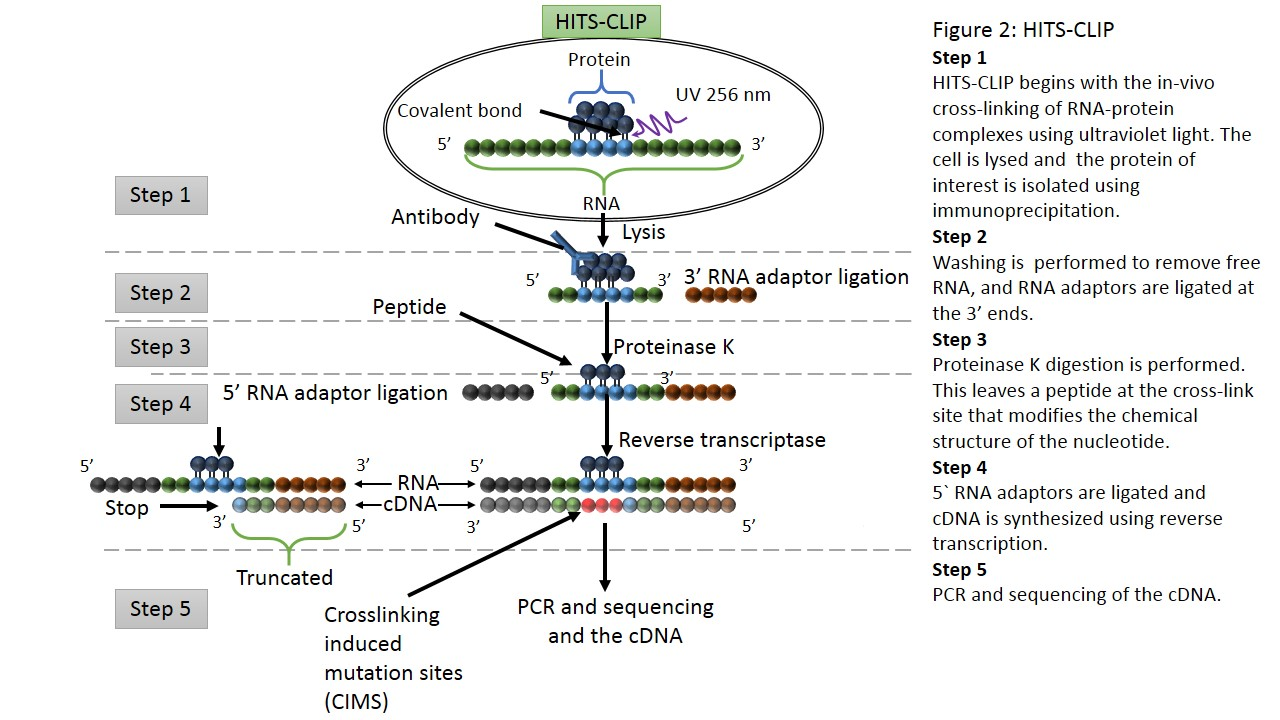
HITS-CLIP

HITS-CLIP combines UV cross-linking and immunoprecipitation with high-throughput sequencing to identify binding sites of RNA-binding proteins. HITS-CLIP also introduced the addition of dinucleotide barcodes to primers, providing the ability to sequence and then deconvolute multiple experiments simultaneously. With analysis of cross-linking induced mutation sites (CIMS) at high sequencing depths, crosslink sites can be differentiated from other sources of sequence variation.

=== PAR-CLIP ===
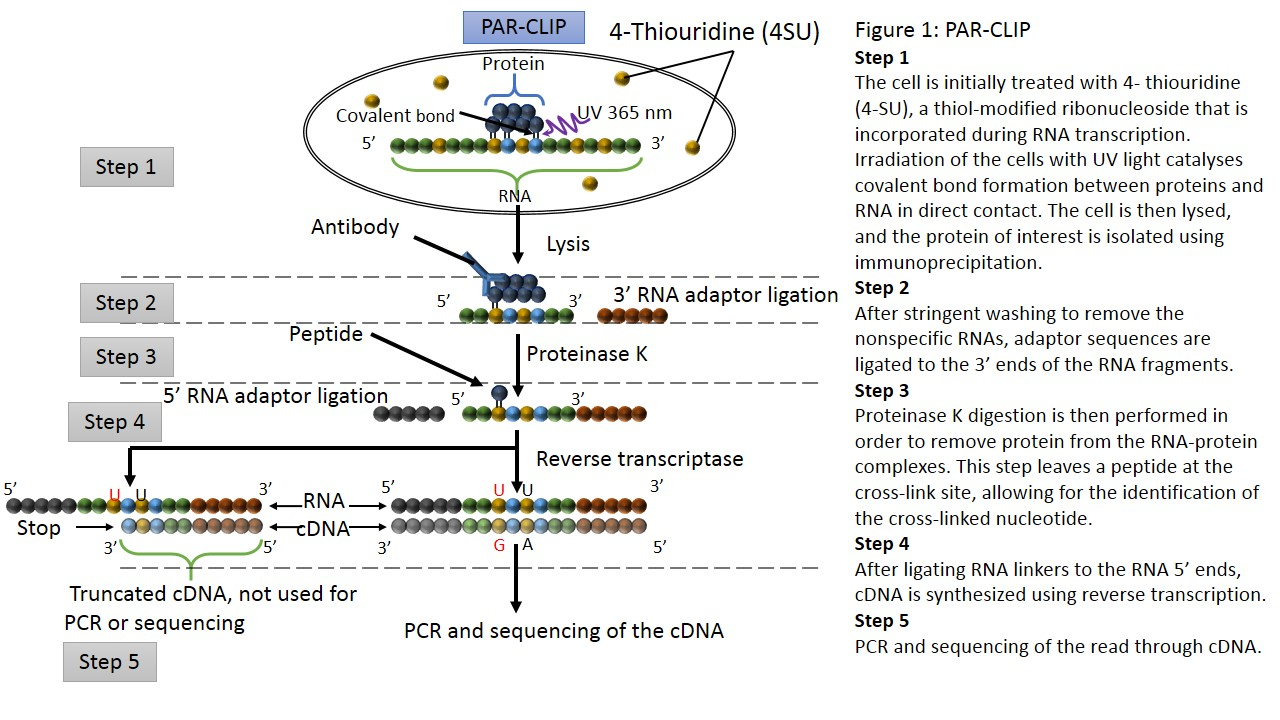
PAR-CLIP

PAR-CLIP (photoactivatable ribonucleoside–enhanced cross-linking and immunoprecipitation) is also used for identifying the binding sites of cellular RNA-binding proteins (RBPs) and microRNA-containing ribonucleoprotein complexes (miRNPs). The method relies on the incorporation of photoreactive ribonucleoside analogs, such as 4-thiouridine (4-SU) and 6-thioguanosine (6-SG) into nascent RNA transcripts by living cells. Irradiation of the cells by UV light of 365 nm induces efficient cross-linking of photoreactive nucleoside-labeled cellular RNAs to interacting RBPs. Immunoprecipitation of the RBP of interest is followed by the isolation of the cross-linked and co-immunoprecipitated RNA. The isolated RNA is converted into a cDNA library and deep sequenced using high-throughput sequencing technology. Cross-linking the 4-SU and 6-SG analogs results in thymidine to cytidine, and guanosine to adenosine transitions respectively. As a result, PAR-CLIP can identify binding site locations with high accuracy.

However, PAR-CLIP is limited mainly to cultured cells, and nucleoside cytotoxicity is a concern; it has been reported that 4-SU inhibits ribosomal RNA synthesis, induces a nucleolar stress response, and reduces cell proliferation. PAR-CLIP has been employed to determine the transcriptome-wide binding sites of several known RBPs and microRNA-containing ribonucleoprotein complexes at high resolution. This includes the miRNA targeting AGO and TNRC6 proteins.

=== iCLIP ===
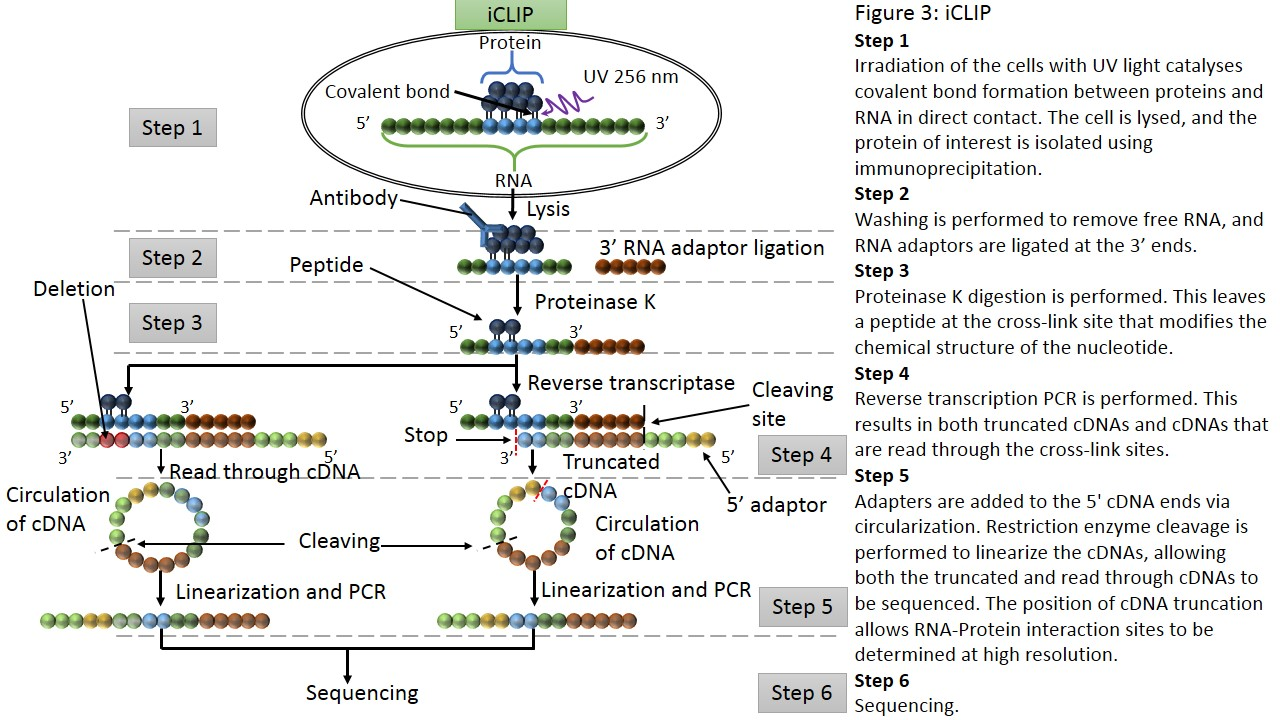
iCLIP

iCLIP (individual nucleotide–resolution crosslinking and immunoprecipitation) is a variant of CLIP that enabled amplification of truncated cDNAs, which are produced when reverse transcription stops prematurely at the cross-link site. Other approaches to identify protein-RNA crosslink sites include mutational analysis of read-through cDNAs, such as nucleotide transitions in PAR-CLIP, or rare errors introduced by reverse transcriptase when it reads through the crosslink sites in standard HITS-CLIP methods, termed Crosslink induced mutation site (CIMS) analysis.

iCLIP also added a random sequence (unique molecular identifier, UMI) along with experimental barcodes to the primer used for reverse transcription, thereby barcoding unique cDNAs to minimise any errors or quantitative biases of PCR, and thus improving the quantification of binding events. Enabling amplification of truncated cDNAs led to identification of the sites of RNA-protein interactions at high resolution by analysing the starting position of truncated cDNAs, as well as their precise quantification using UMIs with software called "iCount". These innovations of iCLIP were adopted by later variants of CLIP such as eCLIP and irCLIP. Another modification of iCLIP, miCLIP, identifies methylated RNA sites with use of mutant enzyme or modification-specific antibody. The quantitative nature of iCLIP enabled comparison across samples at the level of full RNAs, or to study competitive binding of multiple RNA-binding proteins or subtle changes in binding of a mutant protein at the level of binding peaks.

=== eCLIP ===
eCLIP (enhanced CrossLinking and ImmunoPrecipitation followed by high-throughput sequencing) is also used to map RBP binding sites on RNAs transcriptome-wide. eCLIP was designed to improve upon iCLIP by increasing the efficiency in converting purified RNA fragments into cDNA library. At its publication, eCLIP was reported to increase such efficiency by >1000-fold, which not only decreases wasted sequencing of PCR duplicate molecules, but also dramatically decreases experimental failures during the CLIP procedure. Additionally, the amplification in eCLIP is now comparable to RNA-seq, enabling rigorous quantitative normalization against paired input controls (to remove background at ribosomal and other highly abundant RNAs) as well as quantitative comparison across peaks and samples, enabling the ability to detect allele-specific binding or differential RNA binding between conditions.
As in other CLIP methods, eCLIP relies on RBP-RNA interactions covalently linked using UV crosslinking of live cells. Cells are then lysed, and RNA is fragmented using limited RNase treatment. A specific RBP (and its bound RNA) is then immunoprecipitated using an antibody that specifically recognizes the targeted RBP. After ligation of a 3' RNA adapter, immunoprecipitated material (as well as a paired input sample) are run on denaturing protein gels and transferred to nitrocellulose membranes. A region from the protein size to 75 kDa above is cut from the membrane and treated with Proteinase K to release RNA. After cleanup, RNA is then reverse transcribed to ssDNA, when a second adapter is ligated. By ligating the second adapter to cDNAs, eCLIP can identify truncated cDNAs, similar to iCLIP, and thereby study RNA-protein interaction sites with high resolution. PCR amplification is then used to obtain sufficient material for high-throughput sequencing. eCLIP can also be used to identify miRNA targets and profile RNA modifications such as m6A.
eCLIP datasets have been produced for over 150 RBPs with validated commercially available antibodies.

=== Other CLIP methods ===
sCLIP (simple CLIP) is a technique that requires lower amounts of input RNA and omits radio-labeling of the immunoprecipitated RNA. The method is based on linear amplification of the immunoprecipitated RNA and thereby improves the complexity of the sequencing-library despite significantly reducing the amount of input material and omitting several purification steps. Additionally, it permits a radiolabel-free visualization of immunoprecipitated RNA by using a highly sensitive biotin-based labeling technique. Along with a bioinformatical platform this method is designed to provide deep insights into RNA–protein interactomes in biomedical science, where the amount of starting material is often limited (i.e. in case of precious clinical samples). Additional iCLIP variants have also been developed that retain the individual nucleotide resolution but differ in one or more steps from the original iCLIP method. These include iCLIP2, irCLIP, iiCLIP, and iCLIP1.5, a few to name.

As a modification of CLIP, methylated RNA sites were identified with the use of mutant enzyme or modification-specific antibody with the methods termed miCLIP or m6A-CLIP.

== Advantages and limitations ==
=== Advantages ===
RNA-binding proteins are frequently components of multi-protein complexes, and RNAs from various genes are present in cells at a range of abundance, therefore it is common that RNAs bound to co-purified proteins or non-specifically sticking to beads may be isolated when immunoprecipitating a specific protein. The data specificity obtained using early immunoprecipitation methods such as RIP have been demonstrated to be dependent on the reaction conditions of the experiment, such as protein concentrations and ionic conditions, and reassociation of RNA-binding proteins following cell lysis could lead to detection of artificial interactions. Formaldehyde crosslinking methods have been used to preserve RNA-protein interactions, but these also generate protein-protein cross-links. By employing UV crosslinking that is specific to direct protein-RNA contacts, CLIP avoid protein-protein cross-links and ensures high specificity, while also obtaining positional information on the sites of protein-RNA interactions.

Since UV crosslinking creates a covalent bond, the crosslinked RNA fragments retain a short peptide after Proteinase K digestion, which can be exploited to identify the crosslink site. Reverse transcription most often truncates at the crosslink sites, creating truncated cDNAs that are exploited by iCLIP, while read-through cDNAs often contain mutations at the crosslink site (see HITS-CLIP and PAR-CLIP).

=== Limitations ===
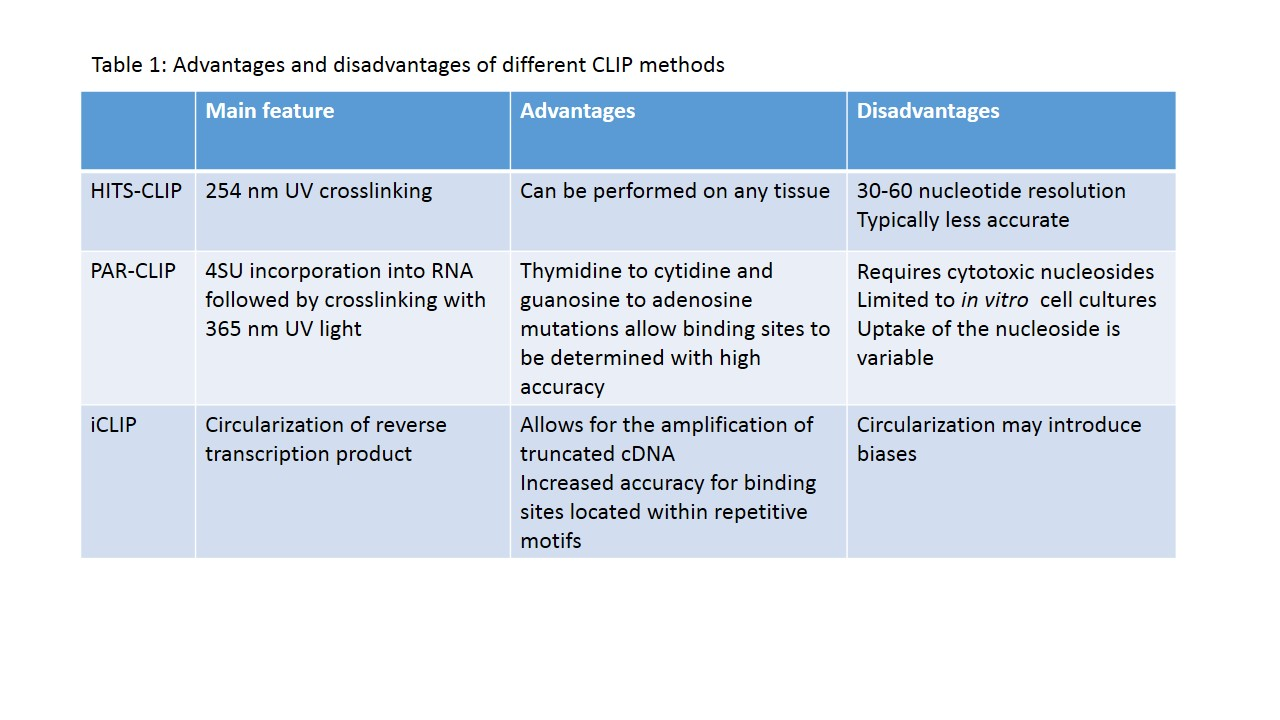
CLIP Summary

All CLIP library generation protocols require moderate quantities of cells or tissue (50–100 mg), require numerous enzymatic steps, and customised computational analyses. Certain steps are difficult to optimize and frequently have low efficiencies. For example, overdigestion with RNase can decrease the number of identified binding sites and thus needs to be optimised. Crosslinking efficiency also varies between proteins, and nucleotide bias of crosslinking has been reported, for example by comparing cross-linking sites and motifs enriched when protein-RNA complexes are studied in vivo in living cells and in vitro, though methods are being developed to minimise such bias for enriched motif discovery. Computationally predicted miRNA targets derived from TargetScan are comparable to CLIP in identifying miRNA targets, raising questions as to its utility relative to existing predictions. Because CLIP methods rely on immunoprecipitation, crosslinked RNA could in some cases affect antibody-epitope interactions. Finally, significant differences have been observed. Therefore, raw CLIP results require further computational analyses to thoroughly investigate RNA-protein binding site interactions within the cell.

== Similar methods ==
- RIP-Chip studies enrichment of full RNAs after immunoprecipitation of specific protein followed by microarray analysis, but without using cross-linking, it does not identify RNA binding sites
- ChIP-Seq, method for finding interactions with DNA rather than RNA
- SELEX, an in vitro method for finding a consensus binding sequence

== Sources ==
- Agarwal, V; Bell, GW; Nam, J-W; Bartel, DP (2015). "Predicting effective microRNA target sites in mammalian mRNAs". eLife. 4 e05005. doi:10.7554/eLife.05005. PMC 4532895. PMID 26267216.
- Bohnsack, MT; Martin, R; Granneman, S; Ruprecht, M; Schleiff, E; Tollervey, D (2009). "Prp43 bound at different sites on the pre-rRNA performs distinct functions in ribosome synthesis". Molecular Cell. 36 (4): 583–592. doi:10.1016/j.molcel.2009.09.039. PMC 2806949. PMID 19941819.
- Burger, K; Mühl, B; Kellner, M; Rohrmoser, M; Gruber-Eber, A; Windhager, L; Friedel, CC; Dölken, L; Eick, D (2013). "4-thiouridine inhibits rRNA synthesis and causes a nucleolar stress response". RNA Biol. 10 (10): 1623–1630. doi:10.4161/rna.26214. PMC 3866244. PMID 24025460.
- Charizanis, K; Lee, KY; Batra, R; Goodwin, M; Zhang, C; Yuan, Y; Shiue, L; Cline, M; Scotti, MM; Xia, G; Kumar, A; Ashizawa, T; Clark, HB; Kimura, T; Takahashi, MP; Fujimura, H; Jinnai, K; Yoshikawa, H; Gomes–Pereira, M; Gourdon, G; Sakai, N; Nishino, S; Foster, TC; Ares, M; Darnell, RB; Swanson, MS (2012). "Muscleblind-like 2-mediated alternative splicing in the developing brain and dysregulation in myotonic dystrophy". Neuron. 75 (3): 437–450. doi:10.1016/j.neuron.2012.05.029. PMC 3418517. PMID 22884328.
- Chi, SW; Zang, JB; Mele, A; Darnell, RB (2009). "Argonaute HITS-CLIP decodes microRNA-mRNA interaction maps". Nature. 460 (7254): 479–486. Bibcode:2009Natur.460..479C. doi:10.1038/nature08170. PMC 2733940. PMID 19536157.
- Darnell, JC; Van Driesche, SJ; Zhang, C; Hung, KY; Mele, A; Fraser, CE; Stone, EF; Chen, C; Fak, JJ; Chi, SW; Licatalosi, DD; Richter, JD; Darnell, RB (2011). "FMRP stalls ribosomal translocation on mRNAs linked to synaptic function and autism". Cell. 146 (2): 247–261. doi:10.1016/j.cell.2011.06.013. PMC 3232425. PMID 21784246.
- Darnell, RB (2010). "HITS-CLIP: panoramic views of protein-RNA regulation in living cells". Wiley Interdiscip Rev RNA. 1 (2): 266–286. doi:10.1002/wrna.31. PMC 3222227. PMID 21935890.
- Darnell, RB (2012). "CLIP (Cross-Linking and Immunoprecipitation) Identification of RNAs Bound by a Specific Protein". Cold Spring Harbor Protocols. 2012 (11): 1146–60. doi:10.1101/pdb.prot072132. PMID 23118367.
- Fecko, CJ; Munson, KM; Saunders, A; Sun, G; Begley, TP; Lis, JT; Webb, WW (2007). "Comparison of femtosecond laser and continuous wave UV sources for protein-nucleic acid crosslinking". Photochemistry and Photobiology. 83 (6): 1394–1404. doi:10.1111/j.1751-1097.2007.00179.x. PMID 18028214. S2CID 23801945.
- Hafner, M; Landthaler, M; Burger, L; Khorshid, M; Hausser, J; Berninger, P; Rothballer, A; Ascano, M; Jungkamp, AC; Munschauer, M; Ulrich, A; Wardle, GS; Dewell, S; Zavolan, M; Tuschl, T (2010). "Transcriptome-wide identification of RNA-binding protein and microRNA target sites by PAR-CLIP". Cell. 141 (1): 129–141. doi:10.1016/j.cell.2010.03.009. PMC 2861495. PMID 20371350.
- Hafner, M; Landthaler, M; Burger, L; Khorshid, M; Hausser, J; Berninger, P; Rothballer, A; Ascano, M; Jungkamp, AC; Munschauer, M; Ulrich, A; Wardle, GS; Dewell, S; Zavolan, M; Tuschl, T (2010b). "PAR-CliP - A Method to Identify Transcriptome-wide the Binding Sites of RNA Binding Proteins". Journal of Visualized Experiments (41) e2034. doi:10.3791/2034. PMC 3156069. PMID 20644507.
- Holmqvist, E; Wright, PR; Li, L; Bischler, T; Barquist, L; Reinhardt, R; Backofen, R; Vogel, J (2016). "Global RNA recognition patterns of post-transcriptional regulators Hfq and CsrA revealed by UV crosslinking in vivo". EMBO J. 35 (9): 991–1011. doi:10.15252/embj.201593360. PMC 5207318. PMID 27044921.
- Ince-Dunn, G; Okano, HJ; Jensen, KB; Park, WY; Zhong, R; Ule, J; Mele, A; Fak, JJ; Yang, CW; Zhang, C; Yoo, J; Herre, M; Okano, H; Noebels, JL; Darnell, RB (2012). "Neuronal Elav-like (Hu) proteins regulate RNA splicing and abundance to control glutamate levels and neuronal excitability". Neuron. 75 (6): 1067–1080. doi:10.1016/j.neuron.2012.07.009. PMC 3517991. PMID 22998874.
- Ke, S; Alemu, EA; Mertens, C; Gantman, EC; Fak, JJ; Mele, A; Haripal, B; Zucker-Scharff, I; Moore, MJ; Park, CY; Vågbø, CB; Kusnierczyk, A; Klungland, A; Darnell, JE; Darnell, RB (2015). "A majority of m6A residues are in the last exons, allowing the potential for 3′ UTR regulation". Genes & Development. 29 (19): 2037–53. doi:10.1101/gad.269415.115. PMC 4604345. PMID 26404942.
- Ke, S; Pandya-Jones, A; Saito, Y; Fak, JJ; Vågbø, CB; Geula, S; Hanna, JH; Black, DL; Darnell, JE; Darnell, RB (2017). "m6A mRNA modifications are deposited in nascent pre-mRNA and are not required for splicing but do specify cytoplasmic turnover". Genes & Development. 31 (10): 990–1006. doi:10.1101/gad.301036.117. PMC 5495127. PMID 28637692.
- König, J; Zarnack, K; Rot, G; Curk, T; Kayikci, M; Zupan, B; Turner, DJ; Luscombe, NM; Ule, J (2010). "iCLIP reveals the function of hnRNP particles in splicing at individual nucleotide resolution". Nat Struct Mol Biol. 17 (7): 909–915. doi:10.1038/nsmb.1838. PMC 3000544. PMID 20601959.
- König, J; McGlincy, NJ; Ule, J (2012). "Analysis of Protein-RNA Interactions with Single-Nucleotide Resolution Using iCLIP and Next-Generation Sequencing". Tag-Based Next Generation Sequencing. p. 153. doi:10.1002/9783527644582.ch10. ISBN 978-3-527-64458-2.
- König, J; Zarnack, K; Luscombe, NM; Ule, J (2012). "Protein-RNA interactions: new genomic technologies and perspectives". Nature Reviews Genetics. 13 (2): 77–83. doi:10.1038/nrg3141. PMC 4962561. PMID 22251872.
- Leung, AK; Young, AG; Bhutkar, A; Zheng, GX; Bosson, AD; Nielsen, CB; Sharp, PA (2011). "Genome-wide identification of Ago2 binding sites from mouse embryonic stem cells with and without mature microRNAs". Nat Struct Mol Biol. 19 (9): 1084. doi:10.1038/nsmb0911-1084a. PMC 3078052.
- Licatalosi, DD; Mele, A; Fak, JJ; Ule, J; Kayikci, M; Chi, SW; Clark, TA; Schweitzer, AC; Blume, JE; Wang, X; Darnell, JC; Darnell, RB (2008). "HITS-CLIP yields genome-wide insights into brain alternative RNA processing". Nature. 456 (7221): 464–469. Bibcode:2008Natur.456..464L. doi:10.1038/nature07488. PMC 2597294. PMID 18978773.
- Licatalosi, DD; Yano, M; Fak, JJ; Mele, A; Grabinski, SE; Zhang, C; Darnell, RB (2012). "Ptbp2 represses adult-specific splicing to regulate the generation of neuronal precursors in the embryonic brain". Genes Dev. 26 (14): 1626–1642. doi:10.1101/gad.191338.112. PMC 3404389. PMID 22802532.
- Mili, S; Steitz, JA (2004). "Evidence for reassociation of RNA-binding proteins after cell lysis: Implications for the interpretation of immunoprecipitation analyses". RNA. 10 (11): 1692–4. doi:10.1261/rna.7151404. PMC 1370654. PMID 15388877.
- Moore, JJ; Zhang, C; Gantman, EC; Mele, A; Darnell, JC; Darnell, RB (2014). "Mapping Argonaute and conventional RNA-binding protein interactions with RNA at single-nucleotide resolution using HITS-CLIP and CIMS analysis". Nature Protocols. 9 (2): 263–293. doi:10.1038/nprot.2014.012. PMC 4156013. PMID 24407355.
- Sanford, JR; Wang, X; Mort, M; Fanduyn, N; Cooper, DN; Mooney, SD; Edenberg, HJ; Liu, Y (2009). "Splicing factor SFRS1 recognizes a functionally diverse landscape of RNA transcripts". Genome Research. 19 (3): 381–394. doi:10.1101/gr.082503.108. PMC 2661799. PMID 19116412.
- Sugimoto, Y; König, J; Hussain, S; Zupan, B; Curk, T; Frye, M; Ule, J (Aug 3, 2012). "Analysis of CLIP and iCLIP methods for nucleotide-resolution studies of protein-RNA interactions". Genome Biology. 13 (8): R67. doi:10.1186/gb-2012-13-8-r67. PMC 4053741. PMID 22863408.
- Thomson, DW; Bracken, CP; Goodall, GJ (2011). "Experimental strategies for microRNA target identification". Nucleic Acids Research. 39 (16): 6845–6853. doi:10.1093/nar/gkr330. PMC 3167600. PMID 21652644.
- Uhl, M; Houwaart, T; Corrado, G; Wright, PR; Backofen, R (2017). "Computational analysis of CLIP-seq data". Methods. 118: 60–72. doi:10.1016/j.ymeth.2017.02.006. hdl:11572/170436. PMID 28254606.
- Ule, J; Jensen, K; Ruggiu, M; Mele, A; Ule, A; Darnell, RB (Nov 14, 2003). "CLIP identified Nova-regulated RNA networks in the brain". Science. 302 (5648): 1212–1215. Bibcode:2003Sci...302.1212U. doi:10.1126/science.1090095. PMID 14615540. S2CID 23420615.
- Ule, J; Jensen, K; Mele, A; Darnell, RB (2005). "CLIP: a method for identifying protein-RNA interactions sites in living cells". Methods. 37 (4): 376–386. doi:10.1016/j.ymeth.2005.07.018. PMID 16314267.
- Xue, Y; Zhou, Y; Wu, T; Zhu, T; Ju, X; Kwon, YS; Zhang, C; Yeo, G; Black, DL; Sun, H; Fu, XD; Zhang, Y (2009). "Genome-wide analysis of PTB-RNA interactions reveals a strategy used by the general splicing repressor to modulate exon inclusion or skipping". Molecular Cell. 36 (6): 996–1006. doi:10.1016/j.molcel.2009.12.003. PMC 2807993. PMID 20064465.
- Yang, JH; Li, JH; Shao, P; Zhou, H; Chen, YQ; Qu, LH (2011). "starBase: a database for exploring microRNA–mRNA interaction maps from Argonaute CLIP-Seq and Degradome-Seq data". Nucleic Acids Res. 39 (Database issue): D202–D209. doi:10.1093/nar/gkq1056. PMC 3013664. PMID 21037263.
- Yeo, GW; Coufal, NG; Liang, TY; Peng, GE; Fu, XD; Gage, FH (2009). "An RNA code for the FOX2 splicing regulator revealed by mapping RNA-protein interactions in stem cells". Nat Struct Mol Biol. 16 (2): 130–137. doi:10.1038/nsmb.1545. PMC 2735254. PMID 19136955.
- Zhang, C; Darnell, RB (2011). "Mapping in vivo protein-RNA interactions at single-nucleotide resolution from HITS-CLIP data". Nature Biotechnology. 29 (7): 607–614. doi:10.1038/nbt.1873. PMC 3400429. PMID 21633356.
- Zisoulis, DG; Lovci, MT; Wilbert, ML; Hutt, KR; Liang, TY; Pasquinelli, AE; Yeo, GW (2010). "Comprehensive discovery of endogenous Argonaute binding sites in Caenorhabditis elegans". Nat Struct Mol Biol. 17 (2): 173–179. doi:10.1038/nsmb.1745. PMC 2834287. PMID 20062054.
- Kargapolova, Y; Levin, M; Lackner, K; Danckwardt, S (2017). "sCLIP—an integrated platform to study RNA–protein interactomes in biomedical research: identification of CSTF2tau in alternative processing of small nuclear RNAs". Nucleic Acids Res. 45 (10): 6074–6086. doi:10.1093/nar/gkx152. PMC 5449641. PMID 28334977.
- Van Nostrand, E; Pratt, G; Shishkin, A (2016). "Robust transcriptome-wide discovery of RNA-binding protein binding sites with enhanced CLIP (eCLIP)". Nature Methods. 13 (6): 508–514. doi:10.1038/nmeth.3810. PMC 4887338. PMID 27018577.
