= RNA immunoprecipitation chip =

RIP-chip (RNA immunoprecipitation chip) is a molecular biology technique which combines RNA immunoprecipitation with a microarray. The purpose of this technique is to identify which RNA sequences interact with a particular RNA binding protein of interest in vivo. It can also be used to determine relative levels of gene expression, to identify subsets of RNAs which may be co-regulated, or to identify RNAs that may have related functions. This technique provides insight into the post-transcriptional gene regulation which occurs between RNA and RNA binding proteins.

An overview of the major stages in the RNA Immunoprecipitation chip procedure.

== Procedural Overview ==
Sources:

1. Collect and lyse the cells of interest.
2. Isolate all RNA fragments and the proteins bound to them from the solution.
3. Immunoprecipitate the protein of interest. The solution containing the protein-bound RNAs is washed over beads which have been conjugated to antibodies. These antibodies are designed to bind to the protein of interest. They pull the protein (and any RNA fragments that are specifically bound to it) out of the solution which contains the rest of the cell contents.
4. Dissociate the protein-bound RNA from the antibody-bead complex. Then, use a centrifuge to separate the protein-bound RNA from the heavier antibody-bead complexes, keeping the protein-bound RNA and discarding the beads.
5. Disassociate the RNA from the protein of interest.
6. Isolate the RNA fragments from the protein using a centrifuge.
7. Use Reverse Transcription PCR to convert the RNA fragments into cDNA (DNA that is complementary to the RNA fragments).
8. Fluorescently label these cDNA fragments.
9. Prepare the gene chip. This is a small chip that has DNA sequences bound to it in known locations. These DNA sequences correspond to all of the known genes in the genome of the organism that the researcher is working with (or a subset of genes that the researcher is interested in). The cDNA sequences that have been collected will be complementary to some of these DNA sequences, as the cDNAs represent a subset of the RNAs transcribed from the genome.
10. Allow the cDNA fragments to competitively hybridize to the DNA sequences bound to the chip.
11. Detection of the fluorescent signal from the cDNA bound to the chip tells researchers which gene(s) on the chip were hybridized to the cDNA.

The genes fluorescently identified by the chip analysis are the genes whose RNA interacts with the original protein of interest. The strength of the fluorescent signal for a particular gene can indicate how much of that particular RNA was present in the original sample, which indicates the expression level of that gene.

== Development and Similar Techniques ==
Previous techniques aiming to understand protein-RNA interactions included RNA Electrophoretic Mobility Shift Assays and UV-crosslinking followed by RT-PCR, however such selective analysis cannot be used when the bound RNAs are not yet known. To resolve this, RIP-chip combines RNA immunoprecipitation to isolate RNA molecules interacting with specific proteins with a microarray which can elucidate the identity of the RNAs participating in this interaction. Alternatives to RIP-chip include:

- RIP-seq: Involves sequencing the RNAs that were pulled down using high-throughput sequencing rather than analyzing them with a microarray. Authors Zhao et al., 2010. combined the RNA immunoprecipitation procedure with RNA sequencing. Using specific antibodies (α-Ezh2) they immunoprecipitated nuclear RNA isolated from mouse ES cells, and subsequently sequenced the pulled-down RNA using the next generation sequencing platform, Illumina.
- CLIP: The RNA binding protein is cross-linked to the RNA via the use of UV light prior to lysis, which is followed by RNA fragmentation, immunoprecipitation, high-salt wash, SDS-PAGE, membrane transfer, proteinase digestion, cDNA library preparation and sequencing in order to identify the direct RNA binding sites. CLIP has first been combined with high throughput sequencing in HITS-CLIP to determine Nova-RNA binding sites in the mouse brain, and in iCLIP that enabled amplification of truncated cDNAs and introduced the use of UMIs.
- ChIP-on-chip: A similar technique which detects the binding of proteins to genomic DNA rather than RNA.
