= SQ1002 =

SQ1002_RNA
- Consensus secondary structure and sequence conservation of Clostridioides difficile sRNA SQ1002

Identifiers
- Symbol: SQ1002_RNA
- Rfam: RF03533

Other data
- RNA type: Gene; sRNA
- GO: GO:0070928
- SO: SO:0000370
- PDB structures: PDBe

SQ1002 is a 191nt small RNA identified in Clostridioides difficile 630 by RNA deep sequencing and confirmed by Northern blot and RT-PCR. Extremities were confirmed by 5' and 3'-RACE.

This RNA is found in several C. difficile strains at syntenic positions between a putative acyltransferase gene and a ferrous iron transport gene. No homologs were found outside C. difficile, although a putative paralog was found in C. difficile 630, located between a tryptophanyl-tRNA synthetase gene and a pseudogene.

Due to lack of sequence variation, the proposed secondary structure is not supported by any covariation and should be considered speculative.
