= BRB-seq =

Technology for RNA sequencing

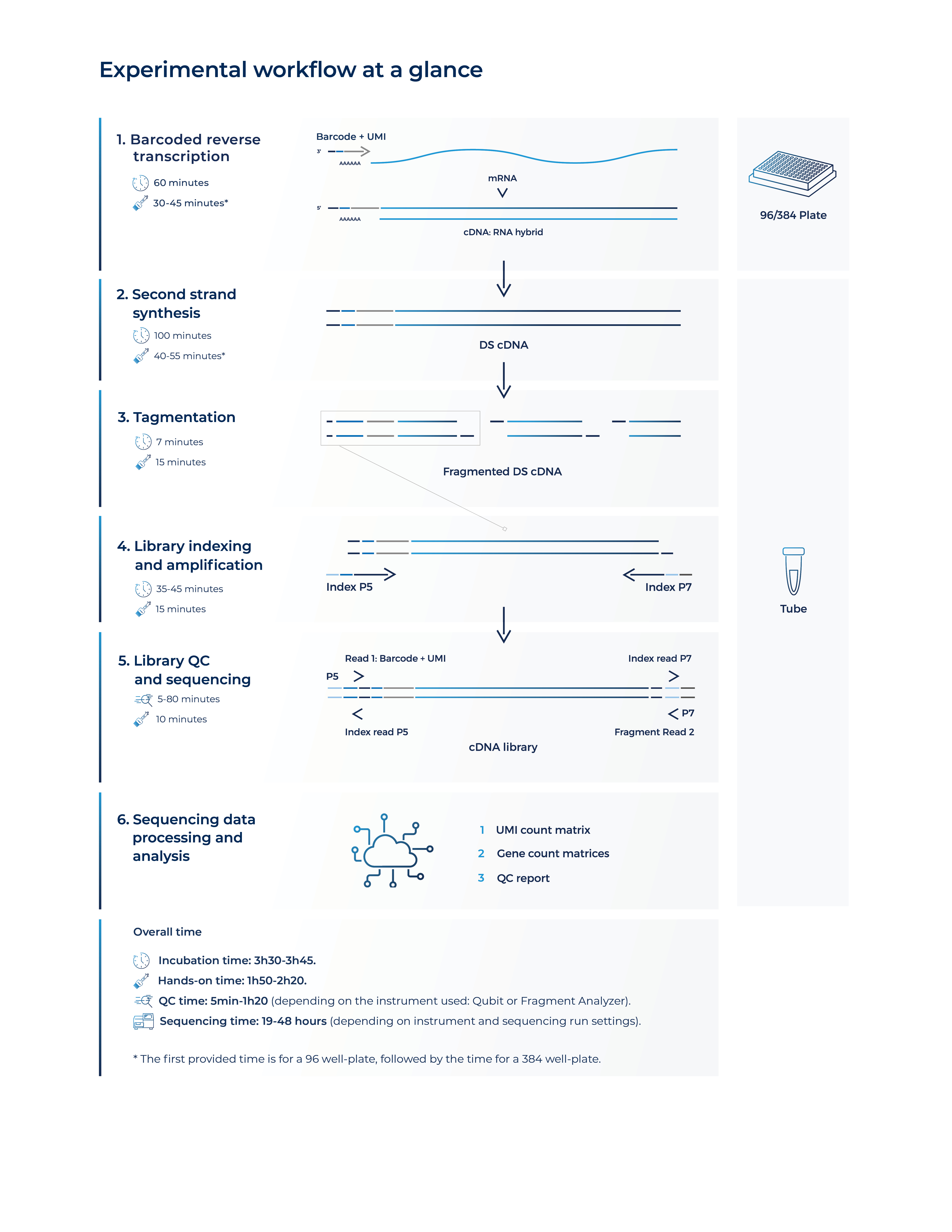
Schematic overview of the MERCURIUS BRB-seq workflow where up to 384 samples can be barcoded and multiplexed per kit

Bulk RNA barcoding and sequencing (BRB-seq) is an ultra-high-throughput bulk 3' mRNA-seq technology that uses early-stage sample barcoding and unique molecular identifiers (UMIs) to allow the pooling of up to 384 samples in one tube early in the sequencing library preparation workflow. The transcriptomic technology is compatible with both Illumina and MGI short-read sequencing instruments.

In standard RNA-seq, a sequencing library must be prepared for each RNA sample individually. In contrast, in BRB-seq, all samples are pooled early in the workflow for simultaneous processing to reduce the cost and hands-on time associated with the library preparation stage

As BRB-seq is a 3' mRNA-seq technique, short reads are generated only for the 3' region of polyadenylated mRNA molecules instead of the full length of transcripts like in standard RNA-seq. This means that BRB-seq requires a far lower sequencing depth per sample to generate genome-wide transcriptomic data that allows users to detect similar numbers of expressed genes and differentially expressed genes as the standard Illumina TruSeq approach but at a cost up to 25 times cheaper or similar to profiling four genes using RT-qPCR. BRB-seq also has a greater tolerance for lower RNA quality (RIN <6) where transcripts are degraded because only the 3' region is required in library preparation

== History ==
The BRB-seq technique was first published in April 2019 in the peer-reviewed journal Genome Research in a manuscript entitled 'BRB-seq: ultra-affordable high-throughput transcriptomics enabled by bulk RNA barcoding and sequencing. By the end of 2019, the article was among the top 10 most-read papers in the journal and has been cited over 150 times (April 2024).

The technique was developed at the École Polytechnique Fédérale de Lausanne in Switzerland in the labs of Professor Bart Deplancke and collaborators. In May 2020, a company called Alithea Genomics was established to provide BRB-seq as kits for researchers or as a full service. BRB-seq builds upon technological advances in single-cell transcriptomics, where sample barcoding made the early multiplexing of hundreds to thousands of single cells possible. Sample multiplexing allowed researchers to create single sequencing libraries containing multiple distinct samples, reducing overall experimental costs and hands-on time while dramatically boosting throughput.

BRB-seq applies these advancements in sample and mRNA barcoding to mRNAs derived from bulk cell populations to enable ultra-high-throughput studies crucial for drug discovery, population studies, or fundamental research.

== Method ==
The fundamental aspect of BRB-seq is the optimized sample barcode primers. Each barcoded nucleotide sequence includes an adaptor for primer annealing, a 14-nt long barcode that assigns a unique identifier to each individual RNA sample, and a random 14-nt long UMI that tags each mRNA molecule with a unique sequence to distinguish between original mRNA transcripts and duplicates that result from PCR amplification bias. BRB-seq allows up to 384 individually barcoded RNA samples to be pooled into one tube early in the workflow to streamline subsequent steps in cDNA library preparation and sequencing.

Input RNA requirements

Isolated total RNA samples require RIN ≥ 6 and an A260/230 ratio ˃ 1.5 when quantified by Nanodrop. Between 10 ng to 1 μg of purified RNA per sample is recommended for standard BRB-seq. To ensure library uniformity and an even distribution of reads for each sample after sequencing, the RNA concentration per input sample, their RIN, and their 260/230 values must be as uniform as possible.

Workflow

The BRB-seq workflow begins by adding isolated RNA samples to individual wells of a 96- or 384-well plate. Each sample then undergoes independent barcoded reverse transcription after the addition of unique optimized barcoded oligo(dT) primers. These primers uniquely tag the 3' poly(A) tail of mRNA molecules during the first-strand synthesis of cDNA. Strand information is preserved. As each RNA sample has an individual barcode, all samples from the 96- or 384-well plate can be pooled into one tube for simultaneous processing after this first step.

Following sample pooling into a single tube, free primers are digested. A second-strand synthesis reaction then results in double-stranded cDNA (DS cDNA).

Next, these full-length cDNA molecules undergo a process called tagmentation facilitated byTn5 transposase preloaded with adaptors necessary for library amplification. The transposase first fragments cDNA molecules and then ligates the pre-loaded adaptors to these cDNA fragments. Higher library complexity occurs when using around 20 ng of cDNA per sample for tagmentation, meaning fewer PCR amplification cycles are required.

For compatibility with Illumina sequencers, the resulting cDNA library is then indexed and amplified using a unique dual indexing (UDI) strategy with indexes P5 and P7. These indexes minimize the risk of barcode misassignment after next-generation sequencing.

Information about the average fragment size of libraries is then required to assess the libraries' molarity and prepare the appropriate library dilution for sequencing. A successful library contains fragments in the range of 300 – 1000 bp with a peak of 400-700 bp.

Unlike standard bulk RNA-seq methods which require around 30 million reads per sample for robust gene expression information, for BRB-seq, a sequencing depth of between one and five million reads per sample is sufficient to detect the majority of expressed genes in a sample. Lowly expressed genes can be detected by sequencing at higher depths.

BRB-seq sequencing data can be analyzed with standard open-source transcriptomic analysis methods, such as STARsolo, designed to align multiplexed data and generate gene and UMI count matrices for downstream RNA-seq analysis from raw fastq files.

== Applications ==
BRB-seq is suitable for any study requiring genome-wide transcriptomic data. It is especially suited to studies with hundreds or thousands of samples thanks to its scalable, straightforward, and quick workflow, which is suitable for automation.

=== AI-driven drug discovery and toxicogenomics ===
Artificial intelligence requires vast amounts of training data to reach robust and reliable conclusions about a drug's on- or off-target biological effects and their toxicogenomic profiles. BRB-seq is a sequencing technology that allows pharmaceutical companies to extract more transcriptomic data at a lower cost to investigate the pharmacological effects of thousands of molecules on cells of interest simultaneously and at scale.

=== Fundamental research ===
BRB-seq has been used to discover a new type of cell that inhibits the formation of fat in humans, with the potential to improve treatments for obesity and type 2 diabetes, to determine the expression of immune genes activated by SARS-CoV-2 at different temperatures in human airway cells and to discover genes that are turned on or off at different times of the day in the fruit fly

=== Agrigenomics ===
Researchers also used Plant BRB-seq in agritranscriptomics to investigate the transcriptomic response of maize to nitrogen fertilizers. They found the differential expression of a subset of stress-responsive genes in response to altering levels of fertilizer
