= Psychromonas antarctica =

Scientific classification
- Domain: Bacteria
- Kingdom: Pseudomonadati
- Phylum: Pseudomonadota
- Class: Gammaproteobacteria
- Order: Alteromonadales
- Family: Psychromonadaceae
- Genus: Psychromonas
- Species: P. antarctica

Binomial name
- Psychromonas antarctica corrig. Mountfort et al. 1998

Species of bacterium

Psychromonas antarctica is a species of bacterium in the phylum Pseudomonadota. The halophilic and psychrophile bacterium was first isolated from a high salinity pond in Antarctica. Psychromonas antarctica is anaerobic but tolerates the presence of oxygen (aerotolerant). It is motile with a polar flagellum.

== Genomic sequence ==
It was reported that a draft of the full genome sequence had been completed, in April 2022. The report states that the sequencing was performed on DNA extracted from Psychromonas antarctica strain DSM 10704. 300 contigs were assembled, with a total length of 3,916,717 bp (base pairs), and 95x coverage. The GenBank master record can be found here, and the sequence read archive can be found here.
