= Small nucleolar RNA SNORA53 =

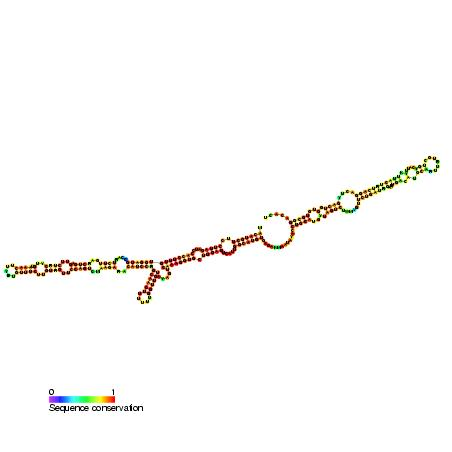
- Predicted secondary structure and sequence conservation of SNORA53

Identifiers
- Symbol: SNORA53
- Alt. Symbols: snoACA53
- Rfam: RF00563

Other data
- RNA type: Gene; snRNA; snoRNA; HACA-box
- Domain: Eukaryota
- GO: GO:0006396 GO:0005730
- SO: SO:0000594
- PDB structures: PDBe

In molecular biology, the snoRNA ACA53 belongs to the H/ACA family of pseudouridylation guide snoRNAs. This H/ACA box RNA was cloned by Kiss et al. (2004) from a HeLa cell extract immunoprecipitated with an anti-GAR1 antibody. It has no identified target RNA. RNA residues targeted for pseudouridylation by this molecule have not been identified.
