= SQ2397 =

RNA sequence

- Consensus secondary structure and sequence conservation of Cis-regulator of HTH transcription factor

Identifiers
- Symbol: SQ2397
- Rfam: RF03532

Other data
- RNA type: Cis-reg
- GO: GO:0051090
- SO: SO:0005836
- PDB structures: PDBe

SQ2397 is an element of RNA that was identified by RNA deep sequencing of Clostridioides difficile 630 where it is located immediately upstream of an uncharacterized HTH-type transcriptional regulator.

Homologs are found widely across Bacillota, consistently located 5' of transcriptional regulators of similar size and sequence, which strongly supports a cis-regulatory function.

This RNA is referred to as CD630_SQ2397.

The sequence is highly conserved and shows no evidence for covariation as per R-scape analysis. The proposed secondary structure is therefore purely hypothetical.
