= ICLIP =

iCLIP (individual-nucleotide resolution crossLinking and immunoprecipitation) is a variant of the original CLIP method used for identifying protein-RNA interactions, which uses UV light to covalently bind proteins and RNA molecules to identify RNA binding sites of proteins. This crosslinking step has generally less background than standard RNA immunoprecipitation (RIP) protocols, because the covalent bond formed by UV light allows RNA to be fragmented, followed by stringent purification, and this also enables CLIP to identify the positions of protein-RNA interactions. As with all CLIP methods, iCLIP allows for a very stringent purification of the linked protein-RNA complexes by stringent washing during immunoprecipitation followed by SDS-PAGE and transfer to nitrocellulose. The labelled protein-RNA complexes are then visualised for quality control, excised from nitrocellulose, and treated with proteinase to release the RNA, leaving only a few amino acids at the crosslink site of the RNA.

The RNA is then reverse transcribed, causing most cDNAs to truncate at the crosslink site, and the key innovation and unique feature in the development of iCLIP was to enable such truncated cDNAs to be PCR amplified and sequenced using a next-generation sequencing platform. iCLIP also added a random sequence (unique molecular identifier, UMI) along with experimental barcodes to the primer used for reverse transcription, thereby barcoding unique cDNAs to minimise any errors or quantitative biases of PCR, and thus improving the quantification of binding events. Enabling amplification of truncated cDNAs led to identification of the sites of RNA-protein interactions at high resolution by analysing the starting position of truncated cDNAs, as well as their precise quantification using UMIs with software called "iCount". All these innovations of iCLIP were adopted by later variants of CLIP such as eCLIP and irCLIP. An additional approach to identify protein-RNA crosslink sites is the mutational analysis of read-through cDNAs, such as nucleotide transitions in PAR-CLIP, or other types of errors that can be introduced by reverse transcriptase when it reads through the crosslink site in standard HITS-CLIP method with the Crosslink induced mutation site (CIMS) analysis.

The quantitative nature of iCLIP enabled pioneering comparison across samples at the level of full RNAs, or to study competitive binding of multiple RNA-binding proteins or subtle changes in binding of a mutant protein at the level of binding peaks. An improved variant of iCLIP (iiCLIP) was recently developed to improve the efficiency and convenience of cDNA library preparation, for example by enzymatically removing adaptor after ligation to minimise artefacts caused by adaptor carry-over, introducing the non-radioactive visualisation of the protein-RNA complex (as done originally by irCLIP), increasing efficiency of ligation, proteinase and reverse transcription reactions, and enabling bead-based purification of cDNAs.

Analysis of CLIP sequencing data benefits from use of customised computational software, much of which is available as part of the Nextflow pipeline for CLIP analysis, and specialised software is available for rapid demultiplexing of complex multiplexed libraries, comparative visualisation of crosslinking profiles across RNAs, identification of the peaks of clustered protein-RNA crosslink sites, and identification of sequence motifs enriched around prominent crosslinks. Moreover, iMaps provides a free CLIP analysis web platform and well-curated community database to facilitate studies of RNA regulatory networks across organisms, with a backend based on the Nextflow pipeline. It is applicable to the many variant protocols of CLIP (such as iCLIP, eCLIP, etc.), and can be used to analyse unpublished data in a secure manner, or to obtain public CLIP data in a well-annotated format, along with various forms of quality control, visualisation and comparison. Questions on the experimental and computational challenges are collated on the Q&A CLIP Forum.
