= PAR-CLIP =

PAR-CLIP (photoactivatable ribonucleoside-enhanced crosslinking and immunoprecipitation) is a biochemical method for identifying the binding sites of cellular RNA-binding proteins (RBPs) and microRNA-containing ribonucleoprotein complexes (miRNPs). The method relies on the incorporation of ribonucleoside analogs that are photoreactive, such as 4-thiouridine (4-SU) and 6-thioguanosine (6-SG), into nascent RNA transcripts by living cells. Irradiation of the cells by ultraviolet light of 365 nm wavelength induces efficient crosslinking of photoreactive nucleoside–labeled cellular RNAs to interacting RBPs. Immunoprecipitation of the RBP of interest is followed by isolation of the crosslinked and coimmunoprecipitated RNA. The isolated RNA is converted into a cDNA library and is deep sequenced using next-generation sequencing technology.

Recently, PAR-CLIP have been applied to determine the transcriptome-wide binding sites of several known RBPs and microRNA-containing ribonucleoprotein complexes at high resolution.

== Similar methods ==
- CLIP-Seq, a similar method for identifying the binding sites of cellular RNA-binding proteins (RBPs) or RNA modification sites using UV light to cross-link RNA to RBPs without the incorporation of photoactivatable groups into RNA.
