= HITS-CLIP =

Method used in molecular biology

High-throughput sequencing of RNA isolated by crosslinking immunoprecipitation (HITS-CLIP) is a variant of CLIP for genome-wide mapping protein–RNA binding sites or RNA modification sites in vivo. HITS-CLIP was originally used to generate genome-wide protein-RNA interaction maps for the neuron-specific RNA-binding protein and splicing factor NOVA1 and NOVA2; since then a number of other splicing factor maps have been generated, including those for PTB, RbFox2, SFRS1, hnRNP C, and even N6-Methyladenosine (m6A) mRNA modifications.

HITS-CLIP of the RNA-binding protein Argonaute has been performed for the identification of microRNA targets by decoding microRNA-mRNA and protein-RNA interaction maps in mouse brain, and subsequently in Caenorhabditis elegans, embryonic stem cells and tissue culture cells.

As a novel modification of HITS-CLIP, m6A-CLIP was developed to precisely map N6-Methyladenosine(m6A) locations in mRNA by UV-crosslinking m6A antibody to the target RNA. Recently, improved bioinformatics applied to Argonaute HITS-CLIP enables identification of binding sites with single nucleotide resolution.

== Similar methods ==
- PAR-CLIP, for identifying the binding sites of cellular RNA-binding proteins (RBPs) and microRNA-containing ribonucleoprotein complexes (miRNPs) in tissue culture cells.
- iCLIP, for a thorough amplification of the cDNA library, including truncated cDNAs, thus also enabling an additional means to identify crosslink sites.
