= Unique molecular identifier =

Unique molecular identifiers (UMIs), or molecular barcodes (MBC) are short sequences or molecular "tags" added to DNA fragments in some next generation sequencing library preparation protocols to identify the input DNA molecule. These tags are added before PCR amplification, and can be used to reduce errors and quantitative bias introduced by the amplification.

Applications include analysis of unique cDNAs to avoid PCR biases in iCLIP, variant calling in ctDNA, gene expression in single-cell RNA-seq (scRNA-seq) and haplotyping via linked reads.

== See also ==
- Batch effect
- Multiplex (assay)
- BRB-seq
