= Epigenetics in stem-cell differentiation =

Overview article

Embryonic stem cells are capable of self-renewing and differentiating to the desired fate depending on their position in the body. Stem cell homeostasis is maintained through epigenetic mechanisms that are highly dynamic in regulating the chromatin structure as well as specific gene transcription programs. Epigenetics has been used to refer to changes in gene expression, which are heritable through modifications not affecting the DNA sequence.

The mammalian epigenome undergoes global remodeling during early stem cell development that requires commitment of cells to be restricted to the desired lineage. There has been multiple evidence suggesting that the maintenance of the lineage commitment of stem cells is controlled by epigenetic mechanisms such as DNA methylation, histone modifications and regulation of ATP-dependent remolding of chromatin structure. Based on the histone code hypothesis, distinct covalent histone modifications can lead to functionally distinct chromatin structures that influence the cell's fate.

This regulation of chromatin through epigenetic modifications is a molecular mechanism that determines whether the cell continues to differentiate into the desired fate. A research study by Lee et al. examined the effects of epigenetic modifications on the chromatin structure and the modulation of these epigenetic markers during stem cell differentiation through in vitro differentiation of murine embryonic stem (ES) cells.

== Experimental background ==
Embryonic stem cells exhibit dramatic and complex alterations to both global and site-specific chromatin structures. Lee et al. performed an experiment to determine the importance of deacetylation and acetylation for stem cell differentiation by looking at global acetylation and methylation levels at certain site-specific modification in histone sites H3K9 and H3K4. Gene expression at these histones regulated by epigenetic modifications is critical in restricting the embryonic stem cell to desired cell lineages and developing cellular memory.

For mammalian cells, the maintenance of cytosine methylation is catalyzed by DNA methyltransferases and any disruption to these methyltransferases will cause a lethal phenotype to the embryo. Cytosine methylation is examined at H3K9, which is associated with inactive heterochromatin and occurs mainly at CpG dinucleotides while global acetylation is examined at H3K4, which is associated with active euchromatin. The mammalian zygotic genome undergoes active and passive global cytosine demethylation following fertilization that reaches a minimal point of 20% CpG methylation at the blastocyst stage to which is then followed by a wave of methylation that reprograms the chromatin structure in order to restore global levels of CpG methylation to 60%. Embryonic stem cells containing reduced or elevation levels of methylation are viable but unable to differentiate and therefore require critical regulation of cytosine methylation for mammalian development.

== Effects of global histone modifications during embryonic stem cell differentiation ==
Histones modifications in chromatin were analyzed at various time intervals (along a 6-day period) following the initiation of in vitro embryonic stem cell differentiation. The removal of leukemia inhibitory factor (LIF) triggers differentiation. Representative data of the histone modifications at the specific sites after LIF removal, assessed using Western blotting, confirms strong deacetylation at the H3K4 and H3K9 positions on histone H3 after one day, followed by a small increase in acetylation by day two.

The methylation of histone H3K4 also decreased after one day of LIF removal but showed a rebound between days 2–4 of differentiation, finally ending with a decrease in methylation on day five. These results indicate a decrease in the level of active euchromatin epigenetic marks upon initiation of embryonic stem cell differentiation which is then followed immediately by reprogramming of the epigenome.

Histone modifications of H3K9 position show a decrease in di- and tri-methylation of undifferentiated embryonic stem cells and had a gradual increase in methylation during the six-day time course of in vitro differentiation, which indicated that there is a global increase of inactive heterochromatin levels at this histone mark.

As the embryonic stem cell undergoes differentiation the markers for active euchromatin (histone acetylation and H3K4 methylation) are decreased after the removal of LIF showing that the cell is indeed becoming more differentiated. The slight rebound in each of these marks allows for further differentiation to occur by allowing another opportunity to decrease the markers once again, bringing the cell closer to its mature state. Since there is also an increase throughout the six-day period in H3K9me, a marker for active heterochromatin, once differentiation occurs it is concluded that the formation of heterochromatin occurs as the cell is differentiated into its desired fate making the cell inactive to prevent further differentiation.

=== DNA methylation in differentiated versus undifferentiated cells ===
Global levels of 5-methylcytosine were compared between undifferentiated and differentiated embryonic stem cells in vitro. The global cytosine methylation pattern appears to be established prior to the reprogramming of the histone code that occurs upon in vitro differentiation of embryonic stem cells.

As the embryonic stem cell undergoes differentiation the level of DNA methylation increases. This indicates that there is an increase in inactive heterochromatin during differentiation.

== Supplemental effects of methylation with DNMTs ==
In mammals, DNA methylation plays a role in regulating a key component of multipotency—the ability to rapidly self-renew. Khavari et al. discussed the fundamental mechanisms of DNA methylation and the interaction with several pathways regulating differentiation. New approaches studying the genomic status of DNA methylation in various states of differentiation have shown that methylation at CpG sites associated with putative enhancers are important in this process. DNA methylation can modulate the binding affinities of transcription factors by recruiting repressors such as MeCP2 which display binding specificity for sequences containing methylated CpG dinucleotides. DNA methylation is controlled by certain methyltransferases, DMNTs, which perform different functions depending on each one. DNMT3A and DNMT3B have both been linked to a role in the establishment of DNA methylation pattern in the early development of the stem cell, whereas DNMT1 is required to methylate a newly synthesized strand of DNA after the cell has undergone replication in order to sustain the epigenetic regulatory state. Numerous proteins can physically interact with DNMTs themselves, which help target DNMT1 to hemi-methylated DNA.

Several new studies point to the central role of DNA methylation interacting with the regulation of cell cycles and DNA repair pathways in order to maintain the undifferentiated state. In embryonic stem cells, DNMT1 depletion within the undifferentiated progenitor cell compartment led to cell cycle arrest, premature differentiation and a failure of tissue self-renewal. The loss of DNMT1 occurred from profound effects associated with activation of differentiation genes and loss of genes promoting cell cycle progression, thus indicating that DNMT1 and other DNMTs do not continuously suppress differentiation and thus maintain the pluripotent state.

These studies point to the importance of the interaction of DNMTs in order to maintain stem cell states allowing for further differentiation and formation of heterochromatin to occur.

== Epigenetic modifications of regulated genes during ESC differentiation ==
Okamoto et al. previously documented the expression level of the Oct4 gene decreasing with embryonic stem cell differentiation. Lee et al. performed a ChIP analysis of the Oct4 promoter, associated with undifferentiated cells, region to examine the epigenetic modifications of regulated genes undergoing development during embryonic stem cell differentiation. This promoter region decreased at H3K4 methylation and H3K9 acetylation sites and increased at the H3K9 methylation site during differentiation. Analysis of a CpG motif of the Oct4 gene promoter revealed a progressive increase of DNA methylation and was completely methylated at day 10 of differentiation as previously reported in Gidekel and Bergman.

These results indicate that there was a shift from the active euchromatin to the inactive heterochromatin due to the decrease of acetylation of H3K4 and an increase of H3K9me. This means that the cell is becoming differentiated at the Oct4 gene, which is coincident with the silence of Oct4 gene expression.

Another site specific gene tested for histone modification was a Brachyury gene, a marker of mesoderm differentiation and is only slightly expressed in undifferentiated embryonic stem cells. "Brachyury" was induced at day five of differentiation and completely silencing by day 10, corresponding to the last day of differentiation. The ChIP analysis of the "Brachyury" gene promoter revealed increase of expression in mono- and di-methylation of H3K4 at day 0 and 5 of embryonic stem cell differentiation with a loss of gene expression at day 10. H3K4 trimethylation coincides with the time of highest Brachyury gene expression since it only had gene expression on day 5. H3K4 methylations in all forms are absent at day 10 of differentiation, which correlates with the silencing of Brachyury gene expression. Mono-methylation of both histones produced expression at day 0 indication a marker that is not useful for chromatin structure. Acetylation of H3K9 does not correlate to Brachyury gene expression since it was down regulated at the induction of differentiation. Upon examining of DNA methylation expression, there was no formation of intermediate sized bad in the Southern analysis suggesting that CpG motifs upstream of the promoter region are not methylated in the absence of cytosine methylation at this site.

It is demonstrated from these studies that both H3K9 di-and tri-methylation correlate with the DNA methylation and gene expression while H3K4 tri-methylation is associated the highest gene expression stage of the Brachyury gene. A previous report from Santos-Rosa is in agreement with these data showing that active genes are associated with H3K4 tri-methylation in yeast.

This data indicated the same results as for the Oct4 gene, in that heterochromatin is forming as differentiation occurs again coinciding with the silence of Brachyury gene expression.

== Epigenetic crosstalk in the keeps ground state ESCs from entering a primed state ==
In a study done by Mierlo et al., data was obtained that suggests unique patterns of H3K27me3 and PCR2 polycomb repressive complexes shield ESCs from leaving the ground state or entering a primed state. They started from the observation that ground state ESCs are maintained by LIF or 2i, and began to investigate what the ground state epigenome looked like. Using ChIP-seq profiling, they were able to determine that the baseline levels of H3K27me3 were higher in 2i ESCs as opposed to those in serum (primed). This conclusion was further supported by the finding in the same paper that 2i ESCs gained primed-like qualities after removing a functional PRC2 complex, which rendered H3K27me3 useless.

== Effect of TSA on stem cell differentiation ==
Leukemia inhibitory factor (LIF) was removed from all the cell lines. LIF inhibits cell differentiation, and its removal allows the cell lines to go through cell differentiation. The cell lines were treated with Trichostatin A (TSA) - a histone deacetylase inhibitor for 6 days. One group of cell lines was treated with 10nM of TSA. The western analysis showed the lack of initial deacetylation on Day-1 which, was observed in the control for the embryonic stem cell differentiation. The lack of histone deacetylase activity allowed the acetylation of H3K9 and histone H4. Embryonic stem cells were also analyzed morphologically to observe the formation of embryoid body formation as one of the measures of cell differentiation. The 10nM TSA treated cells failed to form the embryoid body by Day-6 as observed in the control cell line. This implies that the ES cells treated with TSA lacked the deacetylation on Day-1 and failed to differentiate after the removal of LIF. Second group,’-TSA Day4’ was treated with TSA for 3days. As soon as the TSA treatment was stopped, on day 4 the deacetylation was observed and the acetylation recovered on Day-5. The morphological examination showed the formation of embryoid body formation by Day-6. In addition, the embryoid body formation was faster than the control cell line. This suggests that the ‘-TSA Day4’ lines were responding to the removal of LIF but, were unable to acquire any differentiation phenotype. They were able to acquire the differentiation phenotype after the cessation of TSA treatment and at rapid rate. The morphological examination of the third group,’ 5 nM TSA’ showed the intermediate effect between the control and 10nM-TSA group. The lower dose of TSA allowed the formation of some embryoid body formation. This experiment shows that TSA inhibits histone deacetylase and the activity of histone deacetylase is required for the embryonic stem cell differentiation. Without the initial deacetylation on Day-1, the ES cells cannot go through the differentiation.

== Alkaline phosphatase activity ==
Alkaline phosphatases found in humans are membrane bound glycoproteins, which function to catalyze the hydrolysis of monophosphate esters. McKenna et al. (1979) found that there are at least three varieties of alkaline phosphatases, kidney, liver, and bone alkaline phosphatases, that are all coded by the same structural gene, but contain non-identical carbohydrate moieties. The alkaline phosphatase varieties, therefore, express a unique complement of in the enzymatic processes in post-translational glycosylation of proteins.

In normal stem cells, the activity of alkaline phosphatase activity is lowered upon differentiation. Trichostatin A causes the cells to maintain the activity of alkaline phosphatase. Trichostatin A can cause reversible inhibition of mammalian histone deacetylase, which leads to the inhibition of cell growth Significant increase in alkaline phosphatase extinction was observed when Trichostatin A was withdrawn after three days. Alkaline phosphatase activity correlates with the morphology changes. Initial deacetylation of histone is required for embryonic stem cell differentiation.

== HDAC1, but not HDAC2 controls differentiation ==
Dovery et al. (2010) used HDAC knockout mice to demonstrate whether HDAC1 or HDAC2 was important for the embryonic stem cell differentiation. Examination of global histone acetylation in the absence of HDAC 1 showed an increase in acetylation. Global histone acetylation levels were unchanged by the loss of HDAC2. In order to analyze the process of HDAC knockout mouse in detail, the knockout mice embryonic stem cells were used to generate embryoid bodies. It showed that just before or during gastrulation, embryonic stem cells lacking HDAC1 acquired visible developmental defects. The continued culture of HDAC1 knockout embryonic stem cells showed that the embryoid bodies formed became irregular and reduced in size rather than uniformly spherical as in normal mice. Embryonic stem cell proliferation was unaffected by the loss of either HDAC1 or HDAC2 but the differentiation of embryonic stem cells were affected with that lack of HDAC 1. This shows that HDAC1 is required for cell fate determination during differentiation.

In a study done by Chronis et al. (2017), it was found that during the reprogramming of somatic cells into pluripotent stem cells, OSK (three of the four Yamanaka factors – Oct4, Sox2, KLF4, c-Myc) works together with other transcription factors to change the enhancer landscape, leading to the loss of differentiation and the gain of pluripotency. They were able to determine this by mapping OSKM-binding chromatin states in reprogramming stages and doing loss and gain of function experiments. They were also able to conclude that OSK silenced ME (MEF-enhancers) partially through Hdac1, which suggests that Hdac1 plays a role in the process of reprogramming somatic cells.

== Epidrugs ==
Epigenetics is known to be important in the regulation of gene expression of differentiation. As such, studies done on small molecules or drugs that inhibit epigenetic mechanisms during differentiation can have great potential for clinical applications such as bone regeneration from mesenchymal stem cells. One example of such an application is the use of decitabine (a deoxycytidine analog) to deplete DNA methyl transferase 1 (DNMT1) in the context of melanomas. Alcazar et al. did this with the intent to cause gene expression changes (as a result of the DNMT1 depletion) that would lead to the differentiation of melanocytes, leading to inhibited tumor growth. Small molecules such as these (epidrugs) – while harboring great potential for therapeutic use – are also associated with risk. Circling back to the DNMTi (decitabine), there are known side effects such as anemia that can occur – in addition to other unexpected off-target effects. This underscores the importance of improving the specificity of the epidrug target, and of devising new and improved methods of drug delivery.

== Quantification of the Waddington landscape ==
C. Waddington coined the metaphor of the “epigenetic landscape”, in which a marble rolls down a landscape, its course determined by the topography of the land, eventually working towards a lower point. At different points, these paths branch out, and the marble goes down one path. In this metaphor, the ball is a cell during development, and this metaphor can be extended to the dynamics of gene regulation that underlie cell differentiation (epigenetics). Wang et al (2011). developed a theoretical/mathematical framework for this, which is significant because it is one of the first attempts to link the Waddington landscape idea with gene regulatory networks in a data-driven way. This, in their own words, provides a “framework for studying the global nature of the binary fate decision and commitment of a multipotent cell into one of two cell fates”, which can be an extremely valuable tool for cell reprogramming or just learning more about what could drive differentiation.

== The future ==
Any disturbance of a stable epigenetic regulation of gene expression mediated by DNA methylation is associated with a number of human disorders, including cancer as well as congenital diseases such as pseudohypoparathyroidism type IA, Beckwith-Wiedemann, Prader-Willi and Angelman syndromes, which are each caused by altered methylation-based imprinting at specific loci.

Perturbations of both global and gene-specific patterns of cytosine methylation are commonly observed in cancer while histone deacetylation is an important feature of nuclear reprogramming in oocytes during meiosis.

Recent studies have revealed that there is an array of different pathways that cooperates with one another in order to bestow proper epigenetic regulation by DNA methylation. Future studies will be needed to further clarify the certain mechanism pathways such as DNA binding proteins, DNA repair and noncoding RNAs serve in order to regulate DNA methylation to suppress differentiation and sustain self-renewal in somatic stem cells in the epidermis and other tissues. Addressing these questions will help extend insight into these recent findings for a central role in epigenetic regulators of DNA methylation in controlling embryonic stem cell differentiation.
