= Site-specific DNA-methyltransferase =

Site-specific DNA-methyltransferase may refer to:

- Site-specific DNA-methyltransferase (adenine-specific);
- Site-specific DNA-methyltransferase (cytosine-N4-specific).
