= Modification methylase =

Modification methylase may refer to:

- DNA adenine methylase, an enzyme
- Site-specific DNA-methyltransferase (cytosine-N4-specific), an enzyme
