= DNA (cytosine-5)-methyltransferase 3A =

Protein-coding gene in the species Homo sapiens

DNMT3A
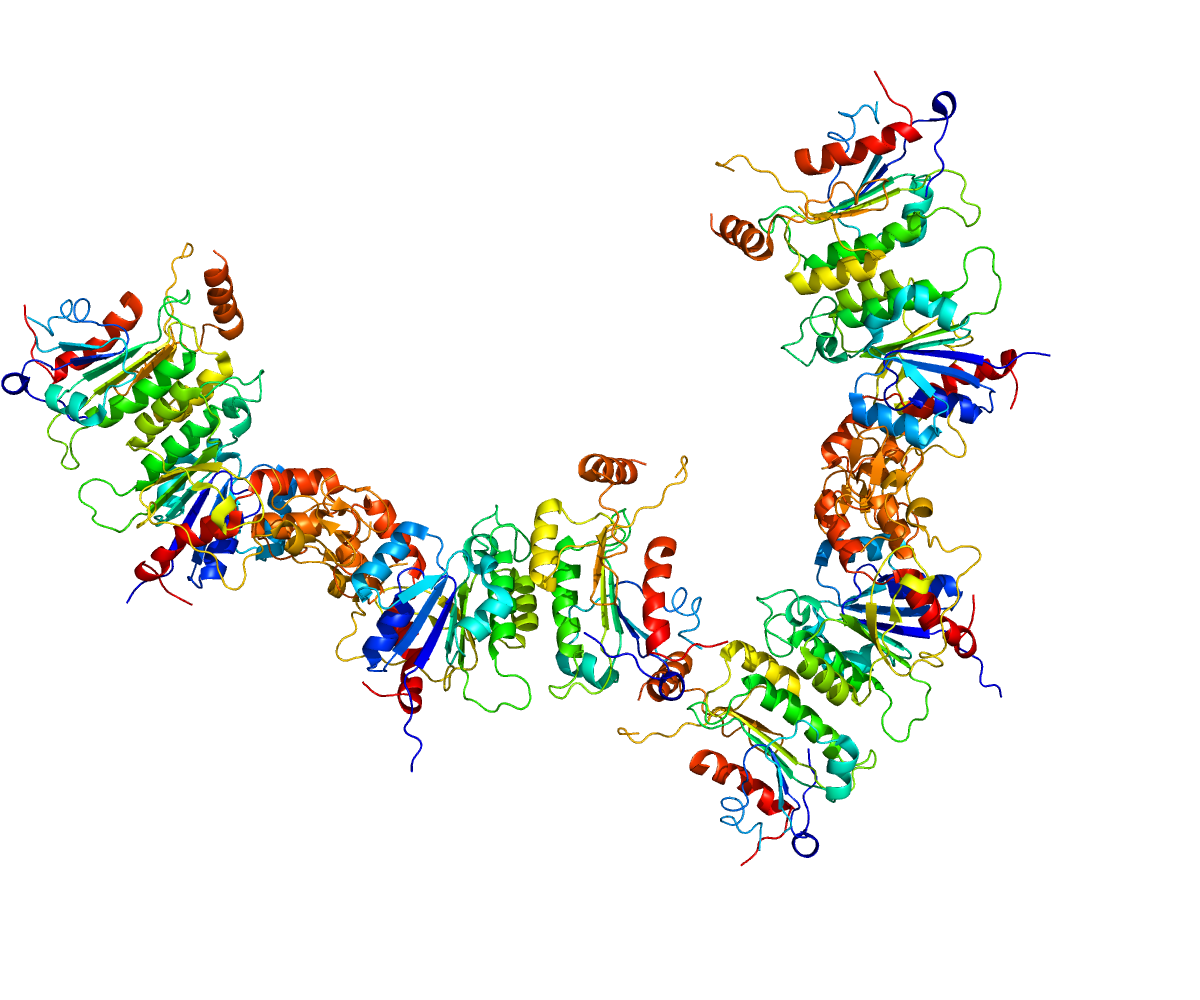

Identifiers
- Aliases: DNMT3A, DNMT3A2, M.HsaIIIA, TBRS, DNA (cytosine-5-)-methyltransferase 3 alpha, DNA methyltransferase 3 alpha, HESJAS
- External IDs: OMIM: 602769; MGI: 1261827; GeneCards: DNMT3A
Available structures
PDB	Ortholog search: PDBe RCSB
PDB	List of PDB id codes 4U7T, 4QBR, 4U7P, 4QBS, 3A1B, 3LLR, 4QBQ, 3SVM, 3A1A, 2QRV
Enzyme activity
EC #	BRENDA	ExPASy	KEGG	MetaCyc
2.1.1.37	↗	↗	↗	↗

Gene location (Human)
Chr.	Chromosome 2 (human)
Band	2p23.3	Start	25,227,855 bp
Band	2p23.3	End	25,342,590 bp

Gene location (Mouse)
Chr.	Chromosome 12 (mouse)
Band	12|12 A1.1	Start	3,856,007 bp
Band	12|12 A1.1	End	3,964,443 bp
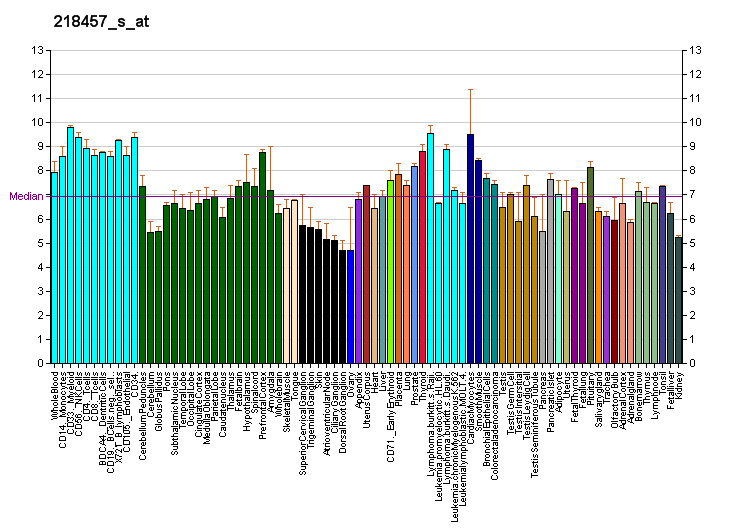
RNA expression pattern
Bgee	Human / Mouse (ortholog); Top expressed in: sural nerve; ganglionic eminence; ventricular zone; Skeletal muscle tissue of biceps brachii; oocyte; placenta; right ovary; muscle of thigh; Skeletal muscle tissue of rectus abdominis; left ovary / Top expressed in: tail of embryo; male urethra; lamina propria of urethra; ejaculatory duct; genital tubercle; epithelium of urethra; female urethra; medullary collecting duct; muscle layer of urethra; Rostral migratory stream; More reference expression data
BioGPS	More reference expression data
Gene ontology
Molecular function	methyltransferase activity; transferase activity; DNA binding; DNA-methyltransferase activity; chromatin binding; metal ion binding; protein binding; identical protein binding; DNA (cytosine-5-)-methyltransferase activity; DNA-binding transcription factor activity, RNA polymerase II-specific; RNA polymerase II cis-regulatory region sequence-specific DNA binding; transcription corepressor activity; transcription factor binding
Cellular component	cytoplasm; euchromatin; nuclear matrix; nucleoplasm; heterochromatin; XY body; chromosome, centromeric region; nucleus
Biological process	response to ionizing radiation; regulation of gene expression by genetic imprinting; C-5 methylation of cytosine; response to estradiol; positive regulation of cell death; cellular response to ethanol; ageing; negative regulation of transcription by RNA polymerase II; DNA methylation involved in gamete generation; response to vitamin A; DNA methylation; methylation; negative regulation of gene expression, epigenetic; response to nutrient levels; response to lead ion; DNA methylation-dependent heterochromatin assembly; spermatogenesis; neuron differentiation; mitotic cell cycle; cellular response to amino acid stimulus; regulation of gene expression; DNA methylation involved in embryo development; response to ethanol; response to toxic substance; cellular response to hypoxia; hepatocyte apoptotic process; response to cocaine; DNA methylation on cytosine; chromatin organization
Sources:Amigo / QuickGO
Orthologs
Databases	NCBI: entry; OMA: entry
Species	Human	Mouse
Entrez	1788	13435
Ensembl	ENSG00000119772	ENSMUSG00000020661
UniProt	Q9Y6K1	O88508
RefSeq (mRNA)	NM_022552; NM_153759; NM_175629; NM_175630; NM_001320892 NM_001320893; NM_001375819	NM_001271753; NM_007872; NM_153743
RefSeq (protein)	NP_001307821; NP_001307822; NP_072046; NP_715640; NP_783328 NP_783329; NP_001362748	NP_001258682; NP_031898; NP_714965
Location (UCSC)	Chr 2: 25.23 – 25.34 Mb	Chr 12: 3.86 – 3.96 Mb
PubMed search
- Wikidata
View/Edit Human	View/Edit Mouse

DNA (cytosine-5)-methyltransferase 3A (DNMT3A) is an enzyme that catalyzes the transfer of methyl groups to specific CpG structures in DNA, a process called DNA methylation. The enzyme is encoded in humans by the DNMT3A gene.

This enzyme is responsible for de novo DNA methylation. Such function is to be distinguished from maintenance DNA methylation which ensures the fidelity of replication of inherited epigenetic patterns. DNMT3A forms part of the family of DNA methyltransferase enzymes, which consists of the protagonists DNMT1, DNMT3A and DNMT3B.

While de novo DNA methylation modifies the information passed on by the parent to the progeny, it enables key epigenetic modifications essential for processes such as cellular differentiation and embryonic development, transcriptional regulation, heterochromatin formation, X-inactivation, imprinting and genome stability.

DNMT3a is the gene most commonly found mutated in clonal hematopoiesis, a common aging-related phenomenon in which hematopoietic stem cells (HSCs) or other early blood cell progenitors contribute to the formation of a genetically distinct subpopulation of blood cells.

== Gene ==
DNMT3A is a 130 kDa protein encoded by 23 exons found on chromosome 2p23 in humans. There exists a 98% homology between human and murine homologues. DNMT3A is widely expressed among mammals.

There are two main protein isoforms, DNMT3A1 and DNMT3A2 with molecular weights of about 130 kDa and 100 kDa, respectively. The DNMT3A2 protein, which lacks the N-terminal region of DNMT3A1, is encoded by a transcript initiated from a downstream promoter. These isoforms exist in different cell types. When originally established, DNMT3A2 was found to be highly expressed in testis, ovary, spleen, and thymus. It was more recently shown to be inducibly expressed in brain hippocampus and needed in the hippocampus when establishing memory. DNMT3A2 is also upregulated in the nucleus accumbens shell in response to cocaine.

== Protein structure ==
DNMT3A consists of three major protein domains: the Pro-Trp-Trp-Pro (PWWP) domain, the ATRX-DNMT3-DNMT3L (ADD) domain and the catalytic methyltransferase domain.

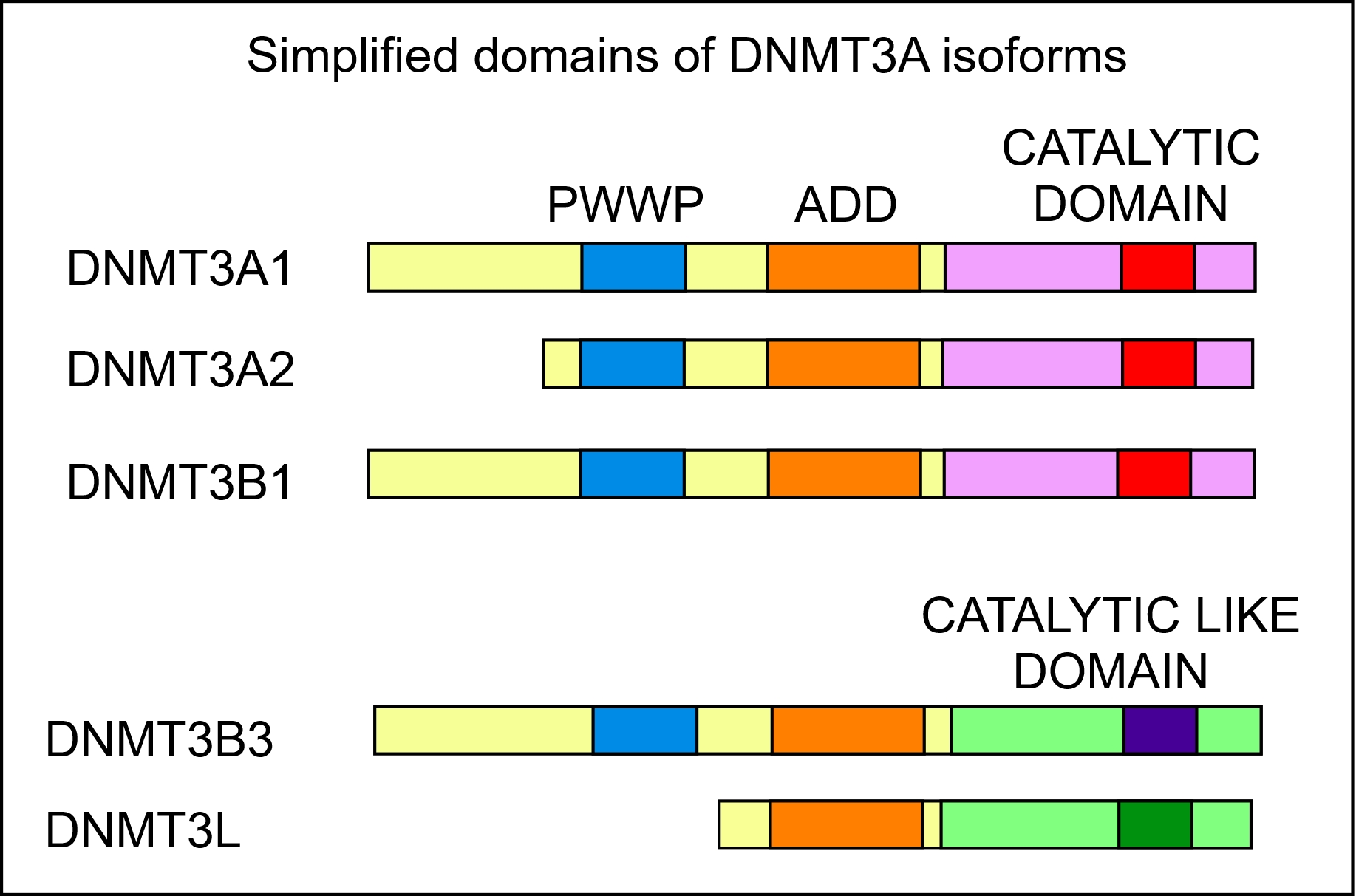
This illustrates 5 isoforms of DNMT3A showing the locations of the PWWP domain, the ADD domain and the catalytic or catalytic-like domains.

The structures of DNMT3A1 and DNMT3A2 have analogies with the structure of DNMT3B1 and also with the two accessory proteins DNMT3B3 and DNMT3L (see Figure of simplified domains of DNMT3A isoforms). The two accessory proteins stimulate de novo methylation by each of their interactions with the three isoforms that have a functional catalytic domain. In general, all DNMTs require accessory proteins for their biological function.

The PWWP motif is within an about 100 amino acid domain that has one area with a significant amount of basic residues (lysines and arginines), giving a positively charged surface that can bind to DNA. A separate region of the PWWP domain can bind to histone methyl-lysines through a hydrophobic pocket that includes the PWWP motif itself.

The ADD domain of DNMT3A is composed of an N-terminal GATA-like zinc finger, a PHD finger and a C-terminal alpha helix, which, together, are arranged into a single globular fold. This domain can act as a reader that specifically binds to histone H3 that is unmethylated at lysine 4 (H3K4me0). The ADD domain serves as an inhibitor of the methyltransferase domain until DNMT3A binds to the unmodified lysine 4 of histone 3 (H3K4me0) for its de novo methylating activity. DNMT3A thus seems to have an inbuilt control mechanism targeting DNA for methylation only at histones that are unmethylated at histone 3 with the lysine at the 4th position from the amino end being un-methylated.

The catalytic domain (the methyltransferase domain) is highly conserved, even among prokaryotes.

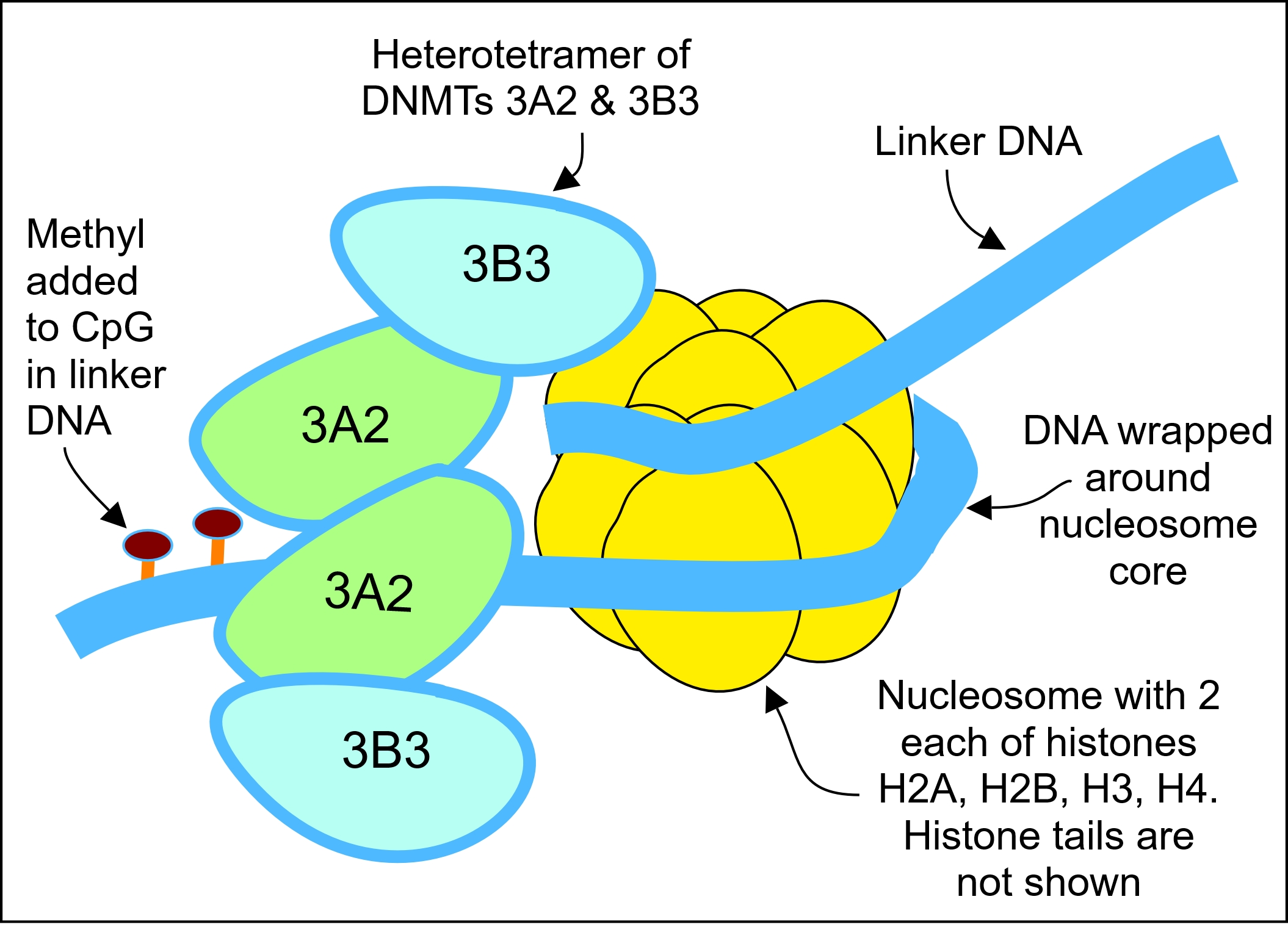
DNMTs such as DNMT3A2, with a functioning catalytic domain, require an accessory protein, such as DNMT3B3 without a functioning catalytic domain, for methylating activity in vivo, as in the heterotetrameric structure shown here.

The three DNA methyltransferases (DNMT3A1, DNMT3A2 and DNMT3B) catalyze reactions placing a methyl group onto a cytosine, usually at a CpG site in DNA. The accompanying Figure shows a methyltransferase complex containing DNMT3A2. These enzymes, to be effective, must act in conjunction with an accessory protein (e.g. DNMT3B3, DNMT3L, or others). Two accessory proteins (which have no catalytic activity), complexed to two DNMTs with a catalytic domain, occur as a heterotetramer (see Figure). These heterotetramers occur in the order: accessory protein-catalytic protein-catalytic protein-accessory protein. The particular complex shown in the Figure illustrates the heterotetramer formed by catalytic protein DNMT3A2 and accessory protein DNMT3B3. One accessory protein of the complex binds to an acidic patch on the nucleosome core (see top 3B3 in Figure). The connection of one accessory protein to the nucleosome orients the heterotetramer. The orientation places the first catalytic DNMT (closest to the accessory protein connected to the nucleosome) in an intermediate position (not close to the linker DNA). The second catalytic DNMT (lower 3A2 in Figure) is placed at the linker DNA. Methylations can take place within this linker DNA (as shown in the Figure) but not on any DNA wrapped around the nucleosome core.

As shown by Manzo et al., there are both specific individual binding sites for the three catalytic DNMTs (3A1, 3A2 and 3B3) as well as overlapping binding sites of these enzymes. There are 28 million CpG sites in the human genome. Many of these CpGs are located within CpG islands (regions of DNA) of relatively high density of CpG sites. Of these regions, there are 3,970 regions exclusively enriched for DNMT3A1, 3,838 regions for DNMT3A2 and 3,432 regions for DNMT3B, and there are sites that are shared between the de novo DNMT proteins. In addition, whether the DNA methyltransferase (DNMT3A1, DNMT3A2 or DNMT3B) acts on an available CpG site depends on the sequence flanking the CpG site within the linker DNA.

== Function ==
DNMT1 is responsible for maintenance DNA methylation while DNMT3A and DNMT3B carry out both maintenance – correcting the errors of DNMT1 – and de novo DNA methylation. After DNMT1 knockout in human cancer cells, these cells were found to retain their inherited methylation pattern, which suggests maintenance activity by the expressed DNMT3s. DNMT3s show equal affinity for unmethylated and hemimethylated DNA substrates while DNMT1 has a 10-40 fold preference for hemimethylated DNA. The DNMT3s can bind to both forms and hence potentially do both maintenance and de novo modifications.

De novo methylation is the main recognized activity of DNMT3A, which is essential for processes such as those mentioned in the introductory paragraphs. Genetic imprinting prevents parthenogenesis in mammals, and hence forces sexual reproduction and its multiple consequences on genetics and phylogenesis. DNMT3A is essential for genetic imprinting.

Research on long-term memory storage in humans indicates that memory is maintained by DNA methylation, Rats in which a new, strong long-term memory is induced due to contextual fear conditioning have reduced expression of about 1,000 genes and increased expression of about 500 genes in the hippocampus region of the brain. These changes occur 24 hours after training. At this point, there is modified expression of 9.17% of the rat hippocampal genome. Reduced expression of genes is associated with de novo methylations of the genes.

== Animal studies ==
In mice, this gene has shown reduced expression in ageing animals causes cognitive long-term memory decline.

In Dnmt3a-/- mice, many genes associated with HSC self-renewal increase in expression and some fail to be appropriately repressed during differentiation. This suggests abrogation of differentiation in hematopoietic stem cells (HSCs) and an increase in self-renewal cell-division instead. Indeed, it was found that differentiation was partially rescued if Dnmt3a-/- HSCs experienced an additional Ctnb1 knockdown – Ctnb1 codes for β-catenin, which participates in self-renewal cell division.

== Clinical relevance ==
This gene is frequently mutated in cancer, being one of 127 frequently mutated genes identified in the Cancer Genome Atlas project DNMT3A mutations were most commonly seen in acute myeloid leukaemia (AML) where they occurred in just over 25% of cases sequenced. These mutations most often occur at position R882 in the protein and this mutation may cause loss of function. DNMT3A mutations are associated with poor overall survival, suggesting that they have an important common effect on the potential of AML cells to cause lethal disease. It has also been found that DNMT3A-mutated cell lines exhibit transcriptome instability, in that they have much more erroneous RNA splicing as compared to their isogenic wildtype counterparts. Mutations in this gene are also associated with Tatton-Brown–Rahman syndrome, an overgrowth disorder.

== Interactions ==
DNMT3A has been shown to interact with:

- DNMT1,
- DNMT3B,
- HDAC1,
- Myc,
- PIAS1,
- PIAS2,
- SUV39H1,
- UBE2I and
- ZNF238.
