= Immunodeficiency–centromeric instability–facial anomalies syndrome =

ICF syndrome
- Other names: Immunodeficiency-centromeric instability-facial anomalies syndrome

Immunodeficiency–centromeric instability–facial anomalies syndrome (also known as ICF syndrome or immunodeficiency, centromere instability and facial anomalies syndrome) is a very rare autosomal recessive immune disorder.

== Presentation ==
It is characterized by variable reductions in serum immunoglobulin (IgG, IgM and/or IgA) levels which cause most ICF patients to succumb to infectious diseases before adulthood. ICF syndrome patients exhibit facial anomalies which include hypertelorism, low-set ears, epicanthal folds and macroglossia. Other frequent symptoms observed in individuals with ICF syndrome include intellectual disability, recurrent and prolonged respiratory infections, and integumentary and digestive system infections.

== Genetics ==
Mutations in four genes can cause this syndrome: Cell division cycle associated protein 7 (CDCA7), DNA-methyltransferase 3b (DNMT3B), Lymphoid specific helicase (HELLS) and Zinc finger- and BTB domain containing protein 24 (ZBTB24).

The CDCA7 gene is located on chromosome 2 (2q31.1), the DNMT3B gene on chromosome 20 (20q11.2)). the HELLS gene on chromosome 10 (10q23.33), and the ZBTB24 gene on chromosome 6 (6q21).

This disease is inherited in an autosomal recessive manner.

== Diagnosis ==
Diagnosis can occur using a karyotype or linkage analysis or DNA sequence analysis. This can occur prior to birth in families with a known history of the condition.

== Treatment ==
For ICF patients the most diffused therapy consists of repeated intravenous infusions of immunoglobulins for the patients entire lifespan. In 2007, Gennery et al. cured the humoral and cellular immunological defect in three ICF1 patients by hematopoietic stem cell transplantation (HSCT). The only side effect was related to the development of autoimmune phenomena in two of them. This is the only documented case of restoring the immune conditions and growth improvement in these patients.

== See also ==
- Bare lymphocyte syndrome
- List of cutaneous conditions
