= Antineoplastic resistance =

Antineoplastic resistance, often used interchangeably with chemotherapy resistance, is the resistance of neoplastic (cancerous) cells, or the ability of cancer cells to survive and grow despite anti-cancer therapies. In some cases, cancers can evolve resistance to multiple drugs, called multiple drug resistance.

There are two general causes of antineoplastic therapy failure: Inherent genetic characteristics, giving cancer cells their resistance and acquired resistance after drug exposure, which is rooted in the concept of cancer cell heterogeneity. Characteristics of resistant cells include altered membrane transport, enhanced DNA repair, apoptotic pathway defects, alteration of target molecules, protein and pathway mechanisms, such as enzymatic deactivation. Since cancer is a genetic disease, two genomic events underlie acquired drug resistance: Genome alterations (e.g. gene amplification and deletion) and epigenetic modifications. Cancer cells are constantly using a variety of tools, involving genes, proteins, and altered pathways, to ensure their survival against antineoplastic drugs.

== Definition ==
Antineoplastic resistance, synonymous with chemotherapy resistance, is the ability of cancer cells to survive and grow despite different anti-cancer therapies, i.e. their multiple drug resistance. There are two general causes of antineoplastic therapy failure: Inherent resistance, such as genetic characteristics, giving cancer cells their resistance from the beginning, which is rooted in the concept of cancer cell heterogeneity and acquired resistance after drug exposure.

== Cancer cell heterogeneity ==
Cancer cell heterogeneity, or tumour heterogeneity, is the idea that tumours are made up of different populations of cancer cells that are morphologically, phenotypically and functionally different.

Cancer cell heterogeneity can cause disease progression when molecularly targeted therapy, fails to kill those tumor cells which do not express the marker, then divide and mutate further, creating a new heterogeneous tumour. In breast cancer models of the mouse the immune microenvironment affects susceptibility to neoadjuvant chemotherapy. In breast cancer, particularly in the triple-negative subtype, immune checkpoint blockade has been used successfully in metastatic cases and neoadjuvant therapy.

== Acquired resistance ==
Since cancer is a genetic disease, two genomic events underlie these mechanisms of acquired drug resistance: Genome alterations (e.g. gene amplification and deletion) and epigenetic modifications.

=== Genetic causes ===
==== Genome alterations ====
Chromosomal rearrangement due to genome instability can cause gene amplification and deletion. Gene amplification is the increase in copy number of a region of a chromosome. which occur frequently in solid tumors, and can contribute to tumor evolution through altered gene expression.

Hamster cell research in 1993 showed that amplifications in the DHFR gene involved in DNA synthesis began with chromosome break in below the gene, and subsequent cycles of bridge-breakage-fusion formations result in large intrachromosomal repeats. The over amplification of oncogenes can occur in response to chemotherapy, thought to be the underlying mechanism in several classes of resistance. For example, DHFR amplification occurs in response to methotrexate, TYMS (involved in DNA synthesis) amplification occurs in response to 5-fluorouracil, and BCR-ABL amplification occurs in response to imatinib mesylate. Determining areas of gene amplification in cells from cancer patients has huge clinical implications. Gene deletion is the opposite of gene amplification, where a region of a chromosome is lost and drug resistance occurs by losing tumor suppressor genes such as TP53.

Genomic instability can occur when the replication fork is disturbed or stalled in its migration. This can occur with replication fork barriers, proteins such as PTIP, CHD4 and PARP1, which are normally cleared by the cell's DNA damage sensors, surveyors, and responders BRCA1 and BRCA2.

==== Epigenetic mechanisms ====
Epigenetic modifications in antineoplastic drug resistance play a major role in cancer development and drug resistance as they contribute to the regulation of gene expression. Two main types of epigenetic control are DNA methylation and histone methylation/acetylation. DNA methylation is the process of adding methyl groups to DNA, usually in the upstream promoter regions, which stops DNA transcription at the region and effectively silences individual genes. Histone modifications, such as deacetylation, alters chromatin formation and silence large chromosomal regions. In cancer cells, where normal regulation of gene expression breaks down, the oncogenes are activated via hypomethylation and tumor suppressors are silenced via hypermethylation. Similarly, in drug resistance development, it has been suggested that epigenetic modifications can result in the activation and overexpression of pro-drug resistance genes.

Studies on cancer cell lines have shown that hypomethylation (loss of methylation) of the MDR1 gene promoter caused overexpression and the multidrug resistance.

In a methotrexate resistant breast cancer cell lines without drug uptake and folate carrier expression, giving DAC, a DNA methylation inhibitor, improved drug uptake and folate carrier expression.

Acquired resistance to the alkylating drug fotemustine in melanoma cell showed high MGMT activity related to the hypermethylation of the MGMT gene exons.

In Imatinib resistant cell lines, silencing of the SOCS-3 gene via methylation has been shown to cause STAT3 protein activation, which caused uncontrolled proliferation.

=== Cancer cell mechanisms ===
Cancer cells can become resistant to multiple drugs by altered membrane transport, enhanced DNA repair, apoptotic pathway defects, alteration of target molecules, protein and pathway mechanisms, such as enzymatic deactivation.

==== Altered membrane transport ====
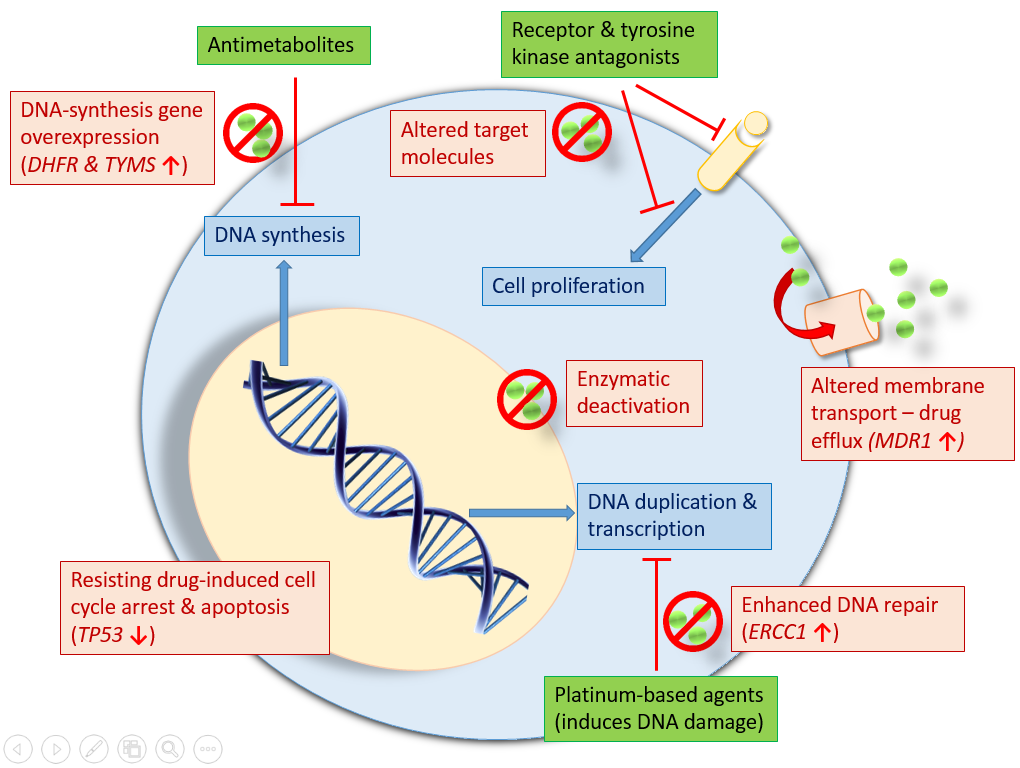
An overview of antineoplastic resistance mechanisms, and examples of the major genes involved. Blue boxes indicate cancer cell proliferation mechanisms; green boxes indicate therapeutic interventions; red boxes indicate resistance mechanisms.

Many classes of antineoplastic drugs act on intracellular components and pathways, like DNA, nuclear components, meaning that they need to enter the cancer cells. The p-glycoprotein (P-gp), or the multiple drug resistance protein, is a phosphorylated and glycosylated membrane transporter that can shuttle drugs out of the cell, thereby decreasing or ablating drug efficacy. This transporter protein is encoded by the MDR1 gene and is also called the ATP-binding cassette (ABC) protein. MDR1 has promiscuous substrate specificity, allowing it to transport many structurally diverse compounds across the cell membrane, mainly hydrophobic compounds. Studies have found that the MDR1 gene can be activated and overexpressed in response to pharmaceutical drugs, thus forming the basis for resistance to many drugs.

For example, the antibiotic rifampicin has been found to induce MDR1 expression. Experiments in different drug resistant cell lines and patient DNA revealed gene rearrangements which had initiated the activation or overexpression of MDR1. A C3435T polymorphism in exon 226 of MDR1 has also been strongly correlated with p-glycoprotein activities.

MDR1 is activated through NF-κB, a protein complex which acts as a transcription factor. In the rat, an NF-κB binding site is adjacent to the mdr1b gene, NF-κB can be active in tumour cells because its mutated NF-κB gene or its inhibitory IκB gene mutated under chemotherapy. In colorectal cancer cells, inhibition of NF-κB or MDR1 caused increased apoptosis in response to a chemotherapeutic agent.

==== Enhanced DNA repair ====
Enhanced DNA repair plays an important role in the ability for cancer cells to overcome drug-induced DNA damages.

Platinum-based chemotherapies, such as cisplatin, target tumour cells by cross-linking their DNA strands, causing mutation and damage. Such damage will trigger programmed cell death (e.g. apoptosis) in cancer cells. Cisplatin resistance occurs when cancer cells develop an enhanced ability to reverse such damage by removing the cisplatin from DNA and repairing any damage done. The cisplatin-resistant cells upregulate expression of the excision repair cross-complementing (ERCC1) gene and protein.

Some chemotherapies are alkylating agents meaning they attach an alkyl group to DNA to stop it from being read. O6-methylguanine DNA methyltransferase (MGMT) is a DNA repair enzyme which removes alkyl groups from DNA. MGMT expression is upregulated in many cancer cells, which protects them from alkylating agents. Increased MGMT expression has been found in colon cancer, lung cancer, non-Hodgkin's lymphoma, breast cancer, gliomas, myeloma and pancreatic cancer.

==== Apoptotic pathway defects ====
TP53 is a tumor suppressor gene encoding the p53 protein, which responds to DNA damage either by DNA repair, cell cycle arrest, or apoptosis. Losing TP53 via gene deletion can allow cells to continuously replicate despite DNA damage. The tolerance of DNA damage can grant cancer cells a method of resistance to those drugs which normally induce apoptosis through DNA damage.

Other genes involved in the apoptotic pathway related drug resistance include h-ras and bcl-2/bax. Oncogenic h-ras has been found to increase expression of ERCC1, resulting in enhanced DNA repair (see above). Inhibition of h-ras was found to increase cisplatin sensitivity in glioblastoma cells. Upregulated expression of Bcl-2 in leukemic cells (non-Hodgkin's lymphoma) resulted in decreased levels of apoptosis in response to chemotherapeutic agents, as Bcl-2 is a pro-survival oncogene.

==== Altered target molecules ====
During targeted therapy, oftentimes the target has modified itself and decreased its expression to the point that therapy is no longer effective. One example of this is the loss of estrogen receptor (ER) and progesterone receptor (PR) upon anti-estrogen treatment of breast cancer. Tumors with loss of ER and PR no longer respond to tamoxifen or other anti-estrogen treatments, and while cancer cells remain somewhat responsive to estrogen synthesis inhibitors, they eventually become unresponsive to endocrine manipulation and no longer dependent on estrogen for growth.

Another line of therapeutics used for treating breast cancer is targeting of kinases like human epidermal growth factor receptor 2 (HER2) from the EGFR family. Mutations often occur in the HER2 gene upon treatment with an inhibitor, with about 50% of patients with lung cancer found to have an EGFR-T790M gatekeeper mutation.

Treatment of chronic myeloid leukemia (CML) involves a tyrosine kinase inhibitor that targets the BCR/ABL fusion gene called imatinib. In some people resistant to Imatinib, the BCR/ABL gene is reactivated or amplified, or a single point mutation has occurred on the gene. These point mutations enhance autophosphorylation of the BCR-ABL protein, resulting in the stabilization of the ATP-binding site into its active form, which cannot be bound by imatinib for proper drug activation.

Topoisomerase is a lucrative target for cancer therapy due to its critical role as an enzyme in DNA replication, and many topoisomerase inhibitors have been made. Resistance can occur when topoisomerase levels are decreased, or when different isoforms of topoisomerase are differentially distributed within the cell. Mutant enzymes have also been reported in patient leukemic cells, as well as mutations in other cancers that confer resistance to topoisomerase inhibitors.

=== Altered metabolism ===
One of the mechanisms of antineoplastic resistance is over-expression of drug-metabolizing enzymes or carrier molecules. By increasing expression of metabolic enzymes, drugs are more rapidly converted to drug conjugates or inactive forms that can then be excreted. For example, increased expression of glutathione promotes drug resistance, as the electrophilic properties of glutathione allow it to react with cytotoxic agents, inactivating them. In some cases, decreased expression or loss of expression of drug-metabolising enzymes confers resistance, as the enzymes are needed to process a drug from an inactive form to an active form. Arabinoside, a commonly used chemotherapy for leukemia and lymphomas, is converted into cytosine arabinoside triphosphate by deoxycytidine kinase. Mutation of deoxycytidine kinase or loss of expression results in resistance to arabinoside.

Growth factor expression levels can also promote resistance to antineoplastic therapies. In breast cancer, drug resistant cells were found to express high levels of IL-6, while sensitive cells did not express significant levels of the growth factor. IL-6 activates the CCAAT enhancer-binding protein transcription factors which activate MDR1 gene expression (see Alteration of Membrane Transport).

== Genetic markers for drug sensitivity and resistance ==
Pharmacogenetics play an increasingly important role in antineoplastic treatment. Rapid sequencing technologies can identify genetic markers for treatment sensitivity and potential resistance. Certain markers are more representative and more likely to be used clinically.

When BRCA1 and BRCA2 are missing, as in 5 percent to 10 percent of all breast cancers, a stalled fork remains destabilized and its newly synthesized DNA is degraded. This genomic instability means the cancer cell is actually more sensitive to DNA-damaging chemotherapy drugs.

Characteristics of Pharmacogenetic Tests
Marker	Drug	Major Conditions	Clinical Implications
TYMS	5-Fluorouracil	Colorectal, stomach, pancreatic cancer	High TYMS may show poor response & less toxicity
DPYD	5-Fluorouracil	Colorectal, stomach, pancreatic cancer	DPD deficiency associated with higher risk of toxicity
UGT1A1	Irinotecan	Colorectal cancer	Decreased UGT1A1 activity may increase risk of toxicity
CYP2D6	Tamoxifen	Breast cancer	Patients with deficient CYP2D6 activity are at greater risks of relapse
EGFR	Anti-EGFR therapy	Colorectal, lung cancer	Activation of EGFR pathways enhances tumor growth, progression, & resistance to therapy
KRAS	Anti-EGFR therapy	Colorectal, lung cancer	KRAS mutation is associated with resistance to anti-EGFR therapy
FCGR3A	Rituximab	Non-Hodgkin's lymphoma	FCRG3A 158Val/Val genotype may be associated with better response
BRCA1/BRCA2	Platinum	Breast, ovarian cancer	BRCA1/2-mutated cancers are more sensitive to DNA damage. Secondary intragenic mutations confer acquired resistance

== Genetic approaches to overcome drug resistance ==
MDR proteins are known to be drug-resistance genes, and are highly expressed in various cancers. Inhibition of the MDR genes could result in sensitization of cells to therapeutics and a decrease in antineoplastic resistance. Reversin 121 (R121) is a high-affinity peptide for MDR, and use of R121 as a treatment for pancreatic cancer cells results in increased chemosensitivity and decreased proliferation.

Aberrant NF-κB expression is found in many cancers, and NF-κB has been found to be involved in resistance to platinum-based chemotherapies, such as cisplatin. NF-κB inhibition by genistein in various cancer cell lines (prostate, breast, lung and pancreas) showed increased growth inhibition and an increase in chemosensitivity, seen as an increase in apoptosis induced by therapeutic agents. However, targeting the NF-κB pathway can be difficult, as there can be many off-target and non-specific effects.

Expression of mutated TP53 causes defects in the apoptotic pathway, allowing cancerous cells to avoid death. Re-expression of the wild-type gene in cancer cells in vitro has been shown to inhibit cell proliferation, induce cell cycle arrest and apoptosis.

In ovarian cancer, the ATP7B gene encodes for a copper efflux transporter, found to be upregulated in cisplatin-resistant cell lines and tumors. Development of antisense deoxynucleotides against ATP7B mRNA and treatment of an ovarian cancer cell line shows that inhibition of ATP7B increases sensitivity of the cells to cisplatin.
