= ZBTB18 =

Protein-coding gene in humans

Identifiers
- Aliases: ZBTB18, C2H2-171, MRD22, RP58, TAZ-1, ZNF238, zinc finger and BTB domain containing 18
- External IDs: OMIM: 608433; MGI: 1353609; GeneCards: ZBTB18

Gene location (Human)
Chr.	Chromosome 1 (human)
Band	1q44	Start	244,048,547 bp
Band	1q44	End	244,057,476 bp

Gene location (Mouse)
Chr.	Chromosome 1 (mouse)
Band	1|1 H4	Start	177,269,917 bp
Band	1|1 H4	End	177,278,330 bp
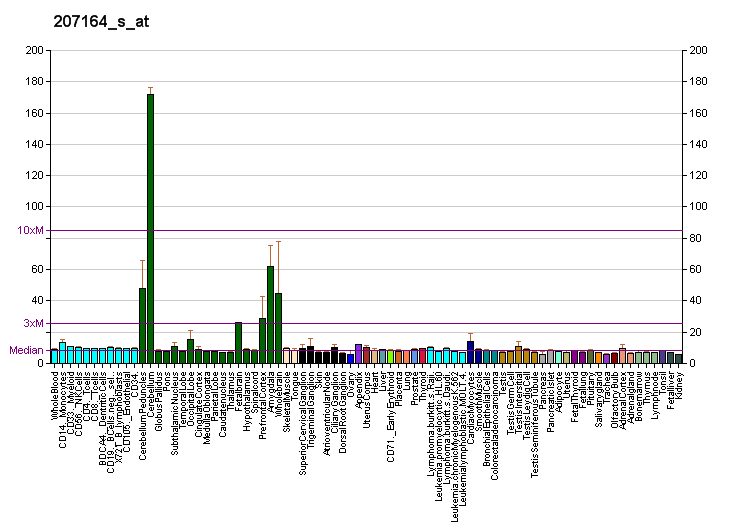

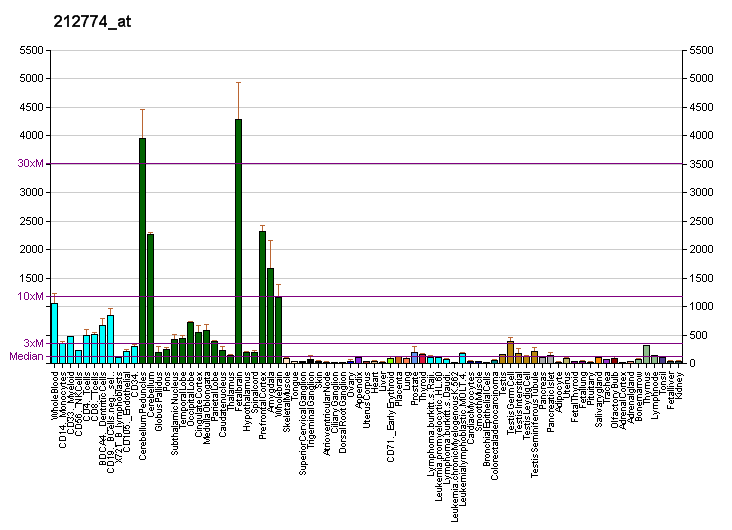
RNA expression pattern
Bgee	Human / Mouse (ortholog); Top expressed in: cerebellar vermis; paraflocculus of cerebellum; Brodmann area 23; Region I of hippocampus proper; ganglionic eminence; Epithelium of choroid plexus; endothelial cell; orbitofrontal cortex; entorhinal cortex; middle temporal gyrus / Top expressed in: lobe of cerebellum; cerebellar vermis; barrel cortex; subdivision of hippocampus; Region I of hippocampus proper; cingulate gyrus; hippocampus proper; prefrontal cortex; primary motor cortex; ganglionic eminence; More reference expression data
BioGPS	More reference expression data
Gene ontology
Molecular function	DNA-binding transcription factor activity; nucleic acid binding; DNA binding; sequence-specific DNA binding; metal ion binding; protein binding; transcription coactivator activity; DNA-binding transcription factor activity, RNA polymerase II-specific
Cellular component	nuclear chromosome; nucleus
Biological process	multicellular organism development; negative regulation of transcription, DNA-templated; regulation of transcription, DNA-templated; negative regulation of transcription by RNA polymerase II; skeletal muscle tissue development; transcription, DNA-templated; positive regulation of transcription by RNA polymerase II; cellular response to DNA damage stimulus
Sources:Amigo / QuickGO
Orthologs
Databases	NCBI: entry; OMA: entry
Species	Human	Mouse
Entrez	10472	30928
Ensembl	ENSG00000179456	ENSMUSG00000063659
UniProt	Q99592	Q9WUK6
RefSeq (mRNA)	NM_001278196; NM_006352; NM_205768	NM_001012330; NM_013915; NM_001355098; NM_001355099; NM_001355100 NM_001355101; NM_001355102; NM_001355103
RefSeq (protein)	NP_001265125; NP_006343; NP_991331	NP_001012330; NP_038943; NP_001342027; NP_001342028; NP_001342029 NP_001342030; NP_001342031; NP_001342032
Location (UCSC)	Chr 1: 244.05 – 244.06 Mb	Chr 1: 177.27 – 177.28 Mb
PubMed search
- Wikidata
View/Edit Human	View/Edit Mouse

Zinc finger and BTB domain-containing protein 18 is a protein than in humans is encoded by the ZBTB18 gene (previously ZNF238). Also known as RP58, it is a zinc finger protein that functions as a transcription factor.

== Function ==
ZBTB18 is a gene that plays a major role in the "promotion of ordered and correctly timed neurogenesis leading to proper layer formation and cortical growth." The loss of ZBTB18 has been observed to cause microcephaly, agenesis of the corpus callosum, malformation of layers in the cerebral cortex, and cerebellar hypoplasia. Additionally, its absence can cause a decrease in Ngn2 and Neurod1 (in progenitor cells, and an increase thereof in mutant neurons), with the result of less progenitor cells and an increase in neuronal differentiation and glial cell growth. ZBTB18 also regulates repressed genes that, if left unchecked, can lead to glioma progression. Furthermore, an absence of ZBTB18 results in upregulation of the epithelial-mesenchymal transition process.

In tumors such as medulloblastomas, the loss of ZBTB18 can disorganize the tumor's cellular divisional processes, resulting in a cellularly diverse neoplasm. This new diversity has been observed to increase the invasiveness of the tumor, yielding proliferation into more areas of the brain than before the loss of ZBTB18.

C2H2-type zinc finger proteins, such as ZBTB18, act on the molecular level as transcriptional activators or repressors and are involved in chromatin assembly.

== Interactions ==
ZBTB18 has been shown to interact with DNMT3A.
