= DNMT3L =

Protein-coding gene in the species Homo sapiens

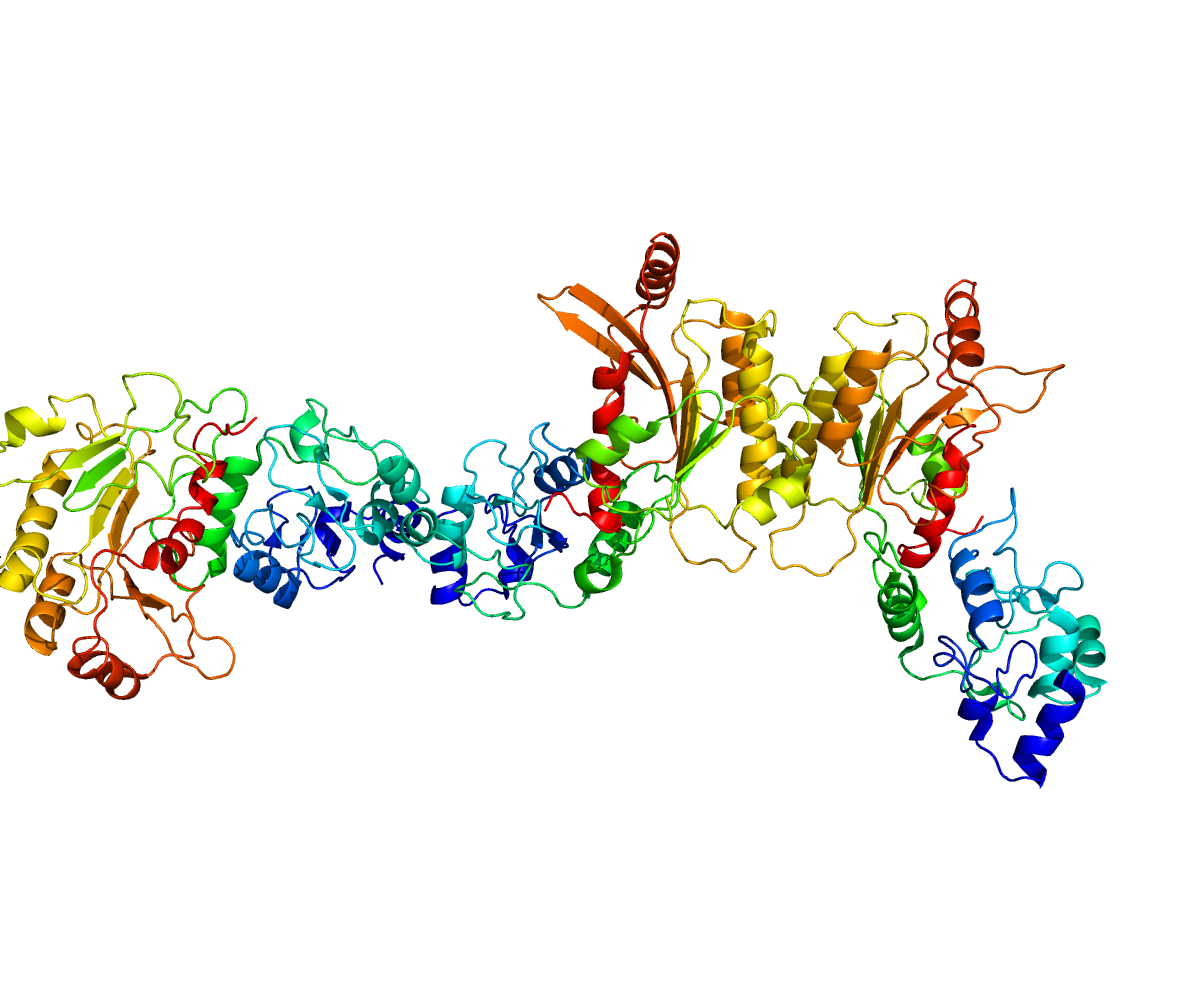

Identifiers
- Aliases: DNMT3L, DNA methyltransferase 3 like
- External IDs: OMIM: 606588; MGI: 1859287; GeneCards: DNMT3L
Available structures
PDB	Ortholog search: PDBe RCSB
PDB	List of PDB id codes 2PV0, 2PVC, 2QRV, 4U7P, 4U7T

Gene location (Human)
Chr.	Chromosome 21 (human)
Band	21q22.3	Start	44,246,339 bp
Band	21q22.3	End	44,262,216 bp

Gene location (Mouse)
Chr.	Chromosome 10 (mouse)
Band	10 C1|10 39.72 cM	Start	77,877,781 bp
Band	10 C1|10 39.72 cM	End	77,899,456 bp
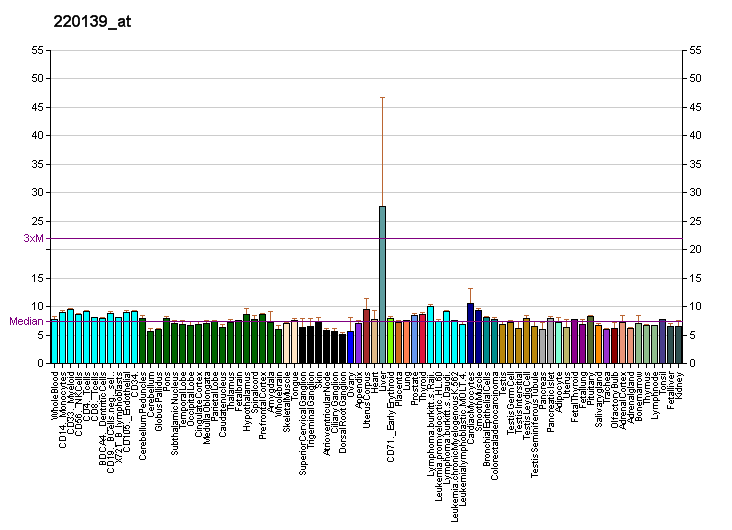
RNA expression pattern
Bgee	Human / Mouse (ortholog); Top expressed in: testicle; liver; right lobe of liver; human kidney; gonad; lymph node; renal cortex; granulocyte; tonsil; mucosa of transverse colon / Top expressed in: transitional epithelium of urinary bladder; primary oocyte; blastocyst; zygote; morula; secondary oocyte; Gonadal ridge; spermatid; embryo; embryo; More reference expression data
BioGPS	More reference expression data
Gene ontology
Molecular function	enzyme binding; enzyme regulator activity; enzyme activator activity; protein binding; metal ion binding; DNA-binding transcription factor activity, RNA polymerase II-specific
Cellular component	cytosol; nucleus; ESC/E(Z) complex
Biological process	regulation of gene expression by genetic imprinting; DNA methylation; regulation of catalytic activity; negative regulation of transcription, DNA-templated; positive regulation of catalytic activity; male meiosis I; spermatogenesis; cell differentiation; DNA methylation on cytosine; DNA methylation involved in gamete generation; stem cell differentiation; negative regulation of DNA methylation; positive regulation of DNA methylation; regulation of transcription by RNA polymerase II
Sources:Amigo / QuickGO
Orthologs
Databases	NCBI: entry; OMA: entry
Species	Human	Mouse
Entrez	29947	54427
Ensembl	ENSG00000142182	ENSMUSG00000000730
UniProt	Q9UJW3	Q9CWR8
RefSeq (mRNA)	NM_013369; NM_175867	NM_001081695; NM_001284197; NM_001284198; NM_001284199; NM_001284200 NM_019448
RefSeq (protein)	NP_037501; NP_787063	NP_001075164; NP_001271126; NP_001271127; NP_001271128; NP_001271129 NP_062321
Location (UCSC)	Chr 21: 44.25 – 44.26 Mb	Chr 10: 77.88 – 77.9 Mb
PubMed search
- Wikidata
View/Edit Human	View/Edit Mouse

DNA (cytosine-5)-methyltransferase 3-like is an enzyme that in humans is encoded by the DNMT3L gene.

== Function ==
CpG methylation is an epigenetic modification that is important for embryonic development, imprinting, and X-chromosome inactivation. Studies in mice have demonstrated that DNA methylation is required for mammalian development. This gene encodes a nuclear protein with similarity to DNA methyltransferases. This protein is not thought to function as a DNA methyltransferase as it does not contain the amino acid residues necessary for methyltransferase activity. However, this protein does stimulate de novo methylation by DNA cytosine methyltransferase 3 alpha and it is thought to be required for the establishment of maternal genomic imprints. This protein also mediates transcriptional repression through interaction with histone deacetylase 1. Alternative splicing results in two transcript variants. An additional splice variant has been described but its biological validity has not been determined.

== Interactions ==
DNMT3L has been shown to interact with HDAC1.
