= PRMT4 pathway =

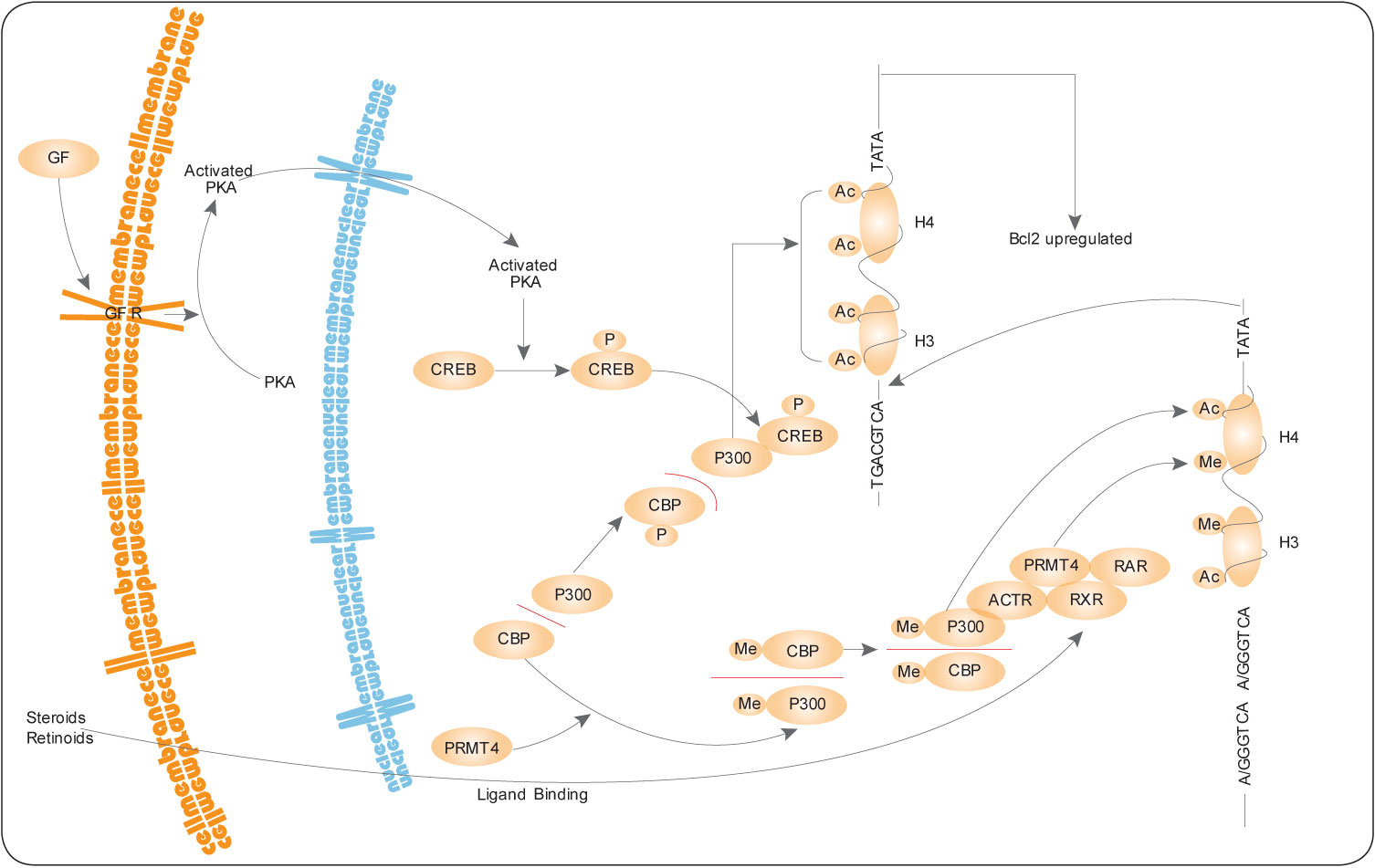
PRMT4 pathway

Protein arginine N-methyltransferase-4 (PRMT4/CARM1) methylation of arginine residues within proteins plays a critical key role in transcriptional regulation (see the PRMT4 pathway on the left). PRMT4 binds to the classes of transcriptional activators known as p160 and CBP/p300. The modified forms of these proteins are involved in stimulation of gene expression via steroid hormone receptors. Significantly, PRMT4 methylates core histones H3 and H4, which are also targets of the histone acetylase activity of CBP/p300 coactivators. PRMT4 recruitment of chromatin by binding to coactivators increases histone methylation and enhances the accessibility of promoter regions for transcription. Methylation of the transcriptional coactivator CBP by PRMT4 inhibits binding to CREB and thereby partitions the limited cellular pool of CBP for steroid hormone receptor interaction.

== See also ==
- DNA methyltransferase
- Nucleosome
- Histone
- Histone-Modifying Enzymes
- Chromatin
- Diet and cancer
