= Transcriptome instability =

Transcriptome instability is a genome-wide, pre-mRNA splicing-related characteristic of certain cancers. In general, pre-mRNA splicing is dysregulated in a high proportion of cancerous cells. For certain types of cancer, like in colorectal and prostate, the number of splicing errors per cancer has been shown to vary greatly between individual cancers, a phenomenon referred to as transcriptome instability. Transcriptome instability correlates significantly with reduced expression level of splicing factor genes. Mutation of DNMT3A contributes to development of hematologic malignancies, and DNMT3A-mutated cell lines exhibit transcriptome instability as compared to their isogenic wildtype counterparts.
