= Cell cycle regulated Methyltransferase =

Bacterial enzyme

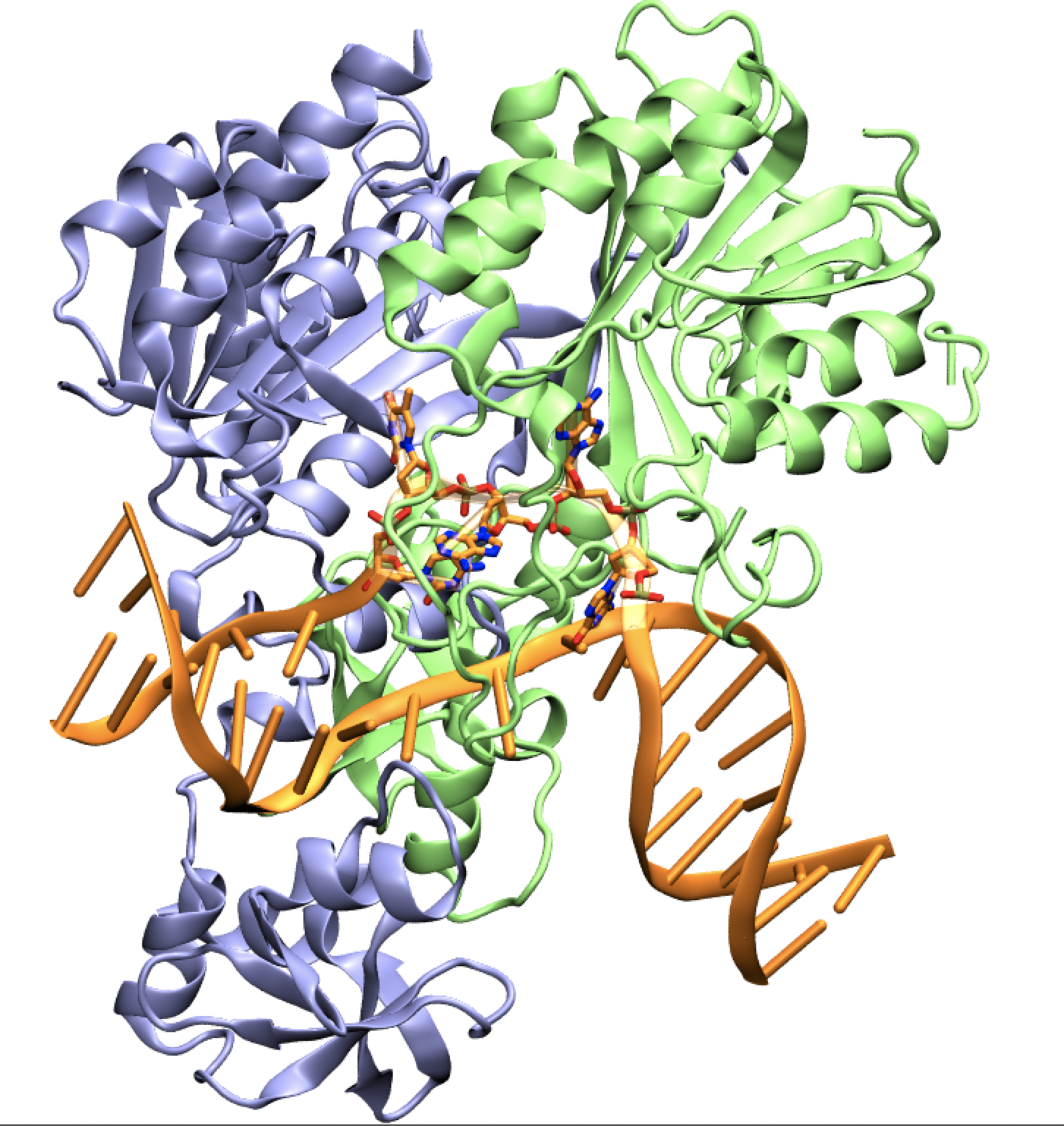
The X-ray crystal structure Caulobacter crescentus CcrM showing the CcrM homodimer in complex with double strand DNA. The protein monomers are shown in blue and green while the DNA is shown in tan. The DNA Bases in the GANTC recognition site are shown in all atom resolution.

CcrM (or M.CcrMI) is an orphan DNA methyltransferase that is involved in controlling gene expression in most Alphaproteobacteria. This enzyme modifies DNA by catalyzing the transference of a methyl group from the S-adenosyl-L methionine substrate to the N6 position of an adenine base in the sequence 5'-GANTC-3' with high specificity. In some lineages such as SAR11, the homologous enzymes possess 5'-GAWTC-3' specificity. In Caulobacter crescentus CcrM is produced at the end of the replication cycle when Ccrm recognition sites are hemimethylated, rapidly methylating the DNA. CcrM is essential in other Alphaproteobacteria but its role is not yet determined. CcrM is a highly specific methyltransferase with a novel DNA recognition mechanism.

== CcrM role in cell cycle regulation ==
Methylations are epigenetic modification that, in eukaryotes, regulates processes as cell differentiation, and embryogenesis, while in prokaryotes can have a role in self recognition, protecting the DNA from being cleaved by the restriction endonuclease system, or for gene regulation. The first function is controlled by the restriction methylation system while the second by Orphan MTases as Dam and CcrM.

CcrM role have been characterized in the freshwater model organism Caulobacter crescentus, which is suitable for the study of cell cycle and epigenetics as it asymmetrically divides generating different progeny, a stalked and a swarmer cell, with different phenotypes and gene regulation. The swarmer cell has a single flagellum and polar pili and is characterized by its mobility, while the stalked cell has a stalk and is fixed to the substrate. The stalked cell enters immediately in S-phase, while the swarmer cell stays in G1-phase and will differentiate to a stalked cell before entering the S-phase again.

The stalked cell in S phase will replicate its DNA in a semiconservative manner producing two hemimethylated DNA double strands that will be rapidly methylated by the Methyltransferase CcrM, which is only produced at the end of the S phase. The enzyme will methylate more than 4 thousand 5'-GANTC-3' sites in around 20 minutes, and then it will be degraded by the LON protease. This fast methylation plays an important role in the transcriptional control of several genes and controls the cell differentiation. CcrM expression is regulated by the CtrA master regulator, and in addition various 5'-GANTC-3' sites methylation sites regulate CcrM expression, which will only occur at the end of the S phase when this sites are hemimethylated. In this process CtrA regulates the expression of CcrM and more than 1000 genes in the pre-divisional state, and SciP prevents the activation of CcrM transcription in non replicative cells.

== CcrM role in Alphaproteobacteria ==
Orphan MTases are common in bacteria and archea CcrM is found in almost every group of Alphaproteobacteria, excepting in Rickettsiales and Magnetococcales, and homologs can be found in Campylobacterota and Gammaproteobacteria. Reviews of alphaproteobacterial cell-cycle regulation describe CcrM and the transcription factor GcrA as a broadly conserved, co-occurring epigenetic regulatory module, implicated in control of genes involved in cell division, polarity, and motility. Alphaproteobacteria are organisms with different life stages from free living to substrate associated, some of them are intracellular pathogens of plants, animal and even human, in those groups the CcrMs must have an important role in cell cycle progression.

CcrM misregulation alters cell cycle regulation and differentiation in various Alphaproteobacteria; C. crescentus, the plant symbiont Sinorhizobium meliloti and in the human pathogen Brucella abortus. Also CcrM gene has proven to be essential for the viability of various Alphaproteobacteria.

== Structure and DNA recognition mechanism ==
CcrM is a type II DNA Methyltransferase, that transfer a methyl group from the methyl donor SAM to the N6 of an adenine in a 5'-GANTC-3' recognition sites of hemimethylated DNA. Based on the order of the conserved motifs that form the SAM binding, the active site and the target recognition domain in the sequence of CcrM it can be classified as a β-class adenine N6 Methyltransferase. CcrM homologs in Alphaproteobacteria have an 80 residues C terminal domain, with non well characterized function.

CcrM is characterized by a high degree of sequence discrimination, showing a very high specificity for GANTC sites over AANTC sites, being able to recognize and methylate this sequence in both double and single strand DNA. CcrM in complex with a dsDNA structure was resolved, showing that the enzyme presents a novel DNA interaction mechanism, opening a bubble in the DNA recognition site (The concerted mechanism of Methyltransferases relies in the flip of the target base), the enzyme interacts with DNA forming an homodimer with differential monomer interactions.

CcrM is a highly efficient enzyme capable of methylating a high number of 5'-GANTC-3' sites in low time, however if the enzyme is processive (the enzyme binds to the DNA and methylate several methylation sites before dissociation) or distributive (the enzyme dissociates from DNA after each methylation) it is still in discussion. First reports indicated the second case, however more recent characterisation of CcrM indicate that it is a processive enzyme.
