= DNMT1 =

Protein-coding gene in the species Homo sapiens

Identifiers
- Aliases: DNMT1, ADCADN, AIM, CXXC9, DNMT, HSN1E, MCMT, m.HsaI, DNA (cytosine-5-)-methyltransferase 1, DNA methyltransferase 1
- External IDs: OMIM: 126375; MGI: 94912; GeneCards: DNMT1
Available structures
PDB	Ortholog search: PDBe RCSB
PDB	List of PDB id codes 4YOC, 3EPZ, 3PTA, 3SWR, 4WXX
Enzyme activity
EC #	BRENDA	ExPASy	KEGG	MetaCyc
2.1.1.37	↗	↗	↗	↗

Gene location (Human)
Chr.	Chromosome 19 (human)
Band	19p13.2	Start	10,133,342 bp
Band	19p13.2	End	10,231,286 bp

Gene location (Mouse)
Chr.	Chromosome 9 (mouse)
Band	9 A3|9 7.66 cM	Start	20,818,505 bp
Band	9 A3|9 7.66 cM	End	20,871,184 bp
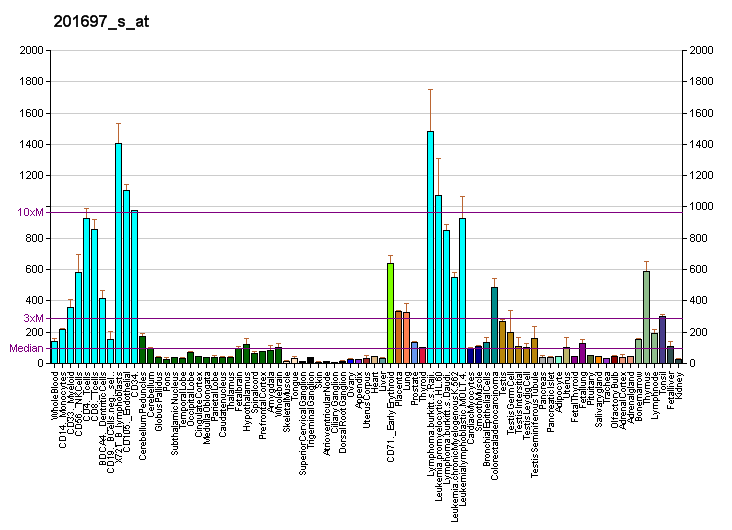
RNA expression pattern
Bgee	Human / Mouse (ortholog); Top expressed in: oocyte; secondary oocyte; sural nerve; ventricular zone; ganglionic eminence; bone marrow cell; appendix; cerebellar hemisphere; right hemisphere of cerebellum; Achilles tendon / Top expressed in: primary oocyte; tail of embryo; genital tubercle; secondary oocyte; zygote; urethra; paramesonephric duct; Paneth cell; somite; tibiofemoral joint; More reference expression data
BioGPS	More reference expression data
Gene ontology
Molecular function	methyltransferase activity; DNA binding; transferase activity; promoter-specific chromatin binding; methyl-CpG binding; zinc ion binding; DNA-methyltransferase activity; chromatin binding; metal ion binding; protein binding; RNA binding; DNA (cytosine-5-)-methyltransferase activity; DNA-binding transcription factor activity, RNA polymerase II-specific
Cellular component	pericentric heterochromatin; replication fork; nucleoplasm; heterochromatin; nucleus
Biological process	C-5 methylation of cytosine; regulation of transcription, DNA-templated; maintenance of DNA methylation; positive regulation of DNA methylation-dependent heterochromatin assembly; negative regulation of transcription by RNA polymerase II; transcription, DNA-templated; methylation; DNA methylation; positive regulation of gene expression; negative regulation of gene expression, epigenetic; positive regulation of histone H3-K4 methylation; regulation of cell population proliferation; negative regulation of histone H3-K9 methylation; cellular response to amino acid stimulus; regulation of gene expression; Ras protein signal transduction; negative regulation of transcription, DNA-templated; DNA methylation on cytosine; DNA methylation involved in embryo development; chromatin organization; DNA methylation on cytosine within a CG sequence; negative regulation of gene expression; positive regulation of vascular associated smooth muscle cell proliferation; negative regulation of vascular associated smooth muscle cell apoptotic process; negative regulation of vascular associated smooth muscle cell differentiation involved in phenotypic switching
Sources:Amigo / QuickGO
Orthologs
Databases	NCBI: entry; OMA: entry
Species	Human	Mouse
Entrez	1786	13433
Ensembl	ENSG00000130816	ENSMUSG00000004099
UniProt	P26358	P13864
RefSeq (mRNA)	NM_001130823; NM_001379; NM_001318730; NM_001318731	NM_001199431; NM_001199432; NM_001199433; NM_010066; NM_001314011
RefSeq (protein)	NP_001124295; NP_001305659; NP_001305660; NP_001370	NP_001186360; NP_001186361; NP_001186362; NP_001300940; NP_034196 NP_001391614
Location (UCSC)	Chr 19: 10.13 – 10.23 Mb	Chr 9: 20.82 – 20.87 Mb
PubMed search
- Wikidata
View/Edit Human	View/Edit Mouse

DNA (cytosine-5)-methyltransferase 1 (Dnmt1) is an enzyme that catalyzes the transfer of methyl groups to specific CpG sites in DNA, a process called DNA methylation. In humans, it is encoded by the DNMT1 gene. Dnmt1 forms part of the family of DNA methyltransferase enzymes, which consists primarily of DNMT1, DNMT3A, and DNMT3B.

== Function ==
This enzyme is responsible for maintaining DNA methylation, which ensures the fidelity of this epigenetic patterns across cell divisions. In line with this role, it has a strong preference towards methylating CpGs on hemimethylated DNA. However, DNMT1 can catalyze de novo DNA methylation in specific genomic contexts, including transposable elements and paternal imprint control regions. Aberrant methylation patterns are associated with certain human tumors and developmental abnormalities.

== See also ==
- DNA methyltransferase

== Interactions ==
DNMT1 has been shown to interact with:

- UHRF1
- DMAP1,
- DNMT3A
- DNMT3B,
- HDAC2,
- PCNA,
- RB1. and
- G9A

DNMT1 is highly transcribed during the S phase of the cell cycle when it is required for methylation of the newly generated hemimethylated sites on daughter DNA strands. Its interaction with PCNA and UHRF1 has been implicated in localizing it to the replication fork. The direct co-operation between DNMT1 and G9a coordinates DNA and H3K9 methylation during cell division. This chromatin methylation is necessary for stable repression of gene expression during mammalian development.

== Model organisms ==
Knockout experiments have shown that this enzyme is responsible for the bulk of methylation in mouse cells, and it is essential for embryonic development. It has also been shown that a lack of both maternal and zygotic Dnmt1 results in complete demethylation of imprinted genes in blastocysts.

== Clinical significance ==
DNMT1 plays a critical role in Hematopoietic stem cell (HSC) maintenance. HSCs with reduced DNMT1 fail to self-renew efficiently post-transplantation. It has also been shown to be critical for other stem cell types such as Intestinal stem cells (ISCs) and Mammary stem cells (MaSCs). Conditional deletion of DNMT1 results in overall intestinal hypomethylation, crypt expansion and altered differentiation timing of ISCs, and proliferation and maintenance of MaSCs.

DNMT1 plays a crucial role in maintaining DNA methylation patterns, which are vital for regulating gene expression and maintaining cellular identity in cancer. Dysregulation of DNMT1 can lead to abnormal methylation patterns, contributing to oncogene activation or tumor suppressor gene silencing, thereby promoting cancer progression and metastasis.

Given the role of DNMT1 in maintaining DNA methylation patterns crucial for gene regulation in cancer, the inhibition of DNMT1 by brazilin, a compound from Caesalpinia sappan, is significant. By reducing DNMT1 expression and altering methylation states through activation of p38 MAPK and elevation of p53 in MCF-7 breast cancer cells, brazilin leads to the restoration of p21 expression. This mechanism highlights brazilin's potential as a therapeutic agent to correct epigenetic alterations associated with cancer progression and metastasis.
