= CDCA7 =

Protein-coding gene in humans

Identifiers
- Aliases: CDCA7, JPO1, ICF3, cell division cycle associated 7
- External IDs: OMIM: 609937; MGI: 1914203; GeneCards: CDCA7

Gene location (Human)
Chr.	Chromosome 2 (human)
Band	2q31.1	Start	173,354,820 bp
Band	2q31.1	End	173,368,997 bp

Gene location (Mouse)
Chr.	Chromosome 2 (mouse)
Band	2|2 C3	Start	72,306,503 bp
Band	2|2 C3	End	72,317,237 bp
RNA expression pattern
Bgee	Human / Mouse (ortholog); Top expressed in: mucosa of ileum; ventricular zone; ganglionic eminence; thymus; rectum; mucosa of sigmoid colon; gonad; duodenum; jejunal mucosa; pylorus / Top expressed in: ventricular zone; thymus; epiblast; medial ganglionic eminence; tail of embryo; hand; primitive streak; embryo; mandibular prominence; abdominal wall; More reference expression data
BioGPS	n/a
Orthologs
Databases	NCBI: entry; OMA: entry
Species	Human	Mouse
Entrez	83879	66953
Ensembl	ENSG00000144354	ENSMUSG00000055612
UniProt	Q9BWT1	Q9D0M2
RefSeq (mRNA)	NM_031942; NM_145810	NM_025866
RefSeq (protein)	NP_114148; NP_665809	NP_080142
Location (UCSC)	Chr 2: 173.35 – 173.37 Mb	Chr 2: 72.31 – 72.32 Mb
PubMed search
- Wikidata
View/Edit Human	View/Edit Mouse

Cell division cycle-associated protein 7 is a protein that in humans is encoded by the CDCA7 gene.

This gene was identified as a c-Myc responsive gene, and behaves as a direct c-Myc target gene. Overexpression of this gene is found to enhance the transformation of lymphoblastoid cells, and it complements a transformation-defective Myc Box II mutant, suggesting its involvement in c-Myc-mediated cell transformation. Two alternatively spliced transcript variants encoding distinct isoforms have been reported.
