= GATA zinc finger =

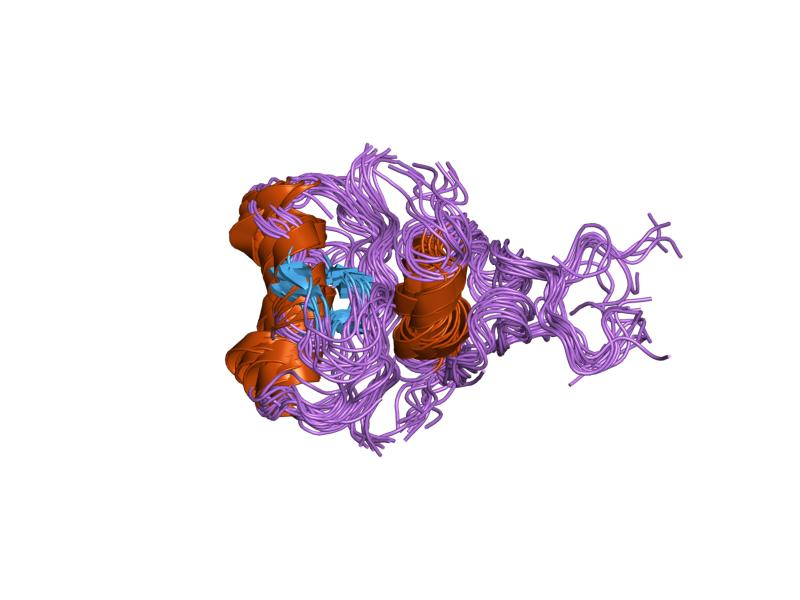
- zinc fingers as protein recognition motifs: structural basis for the gata-1/friend of gata interaction

Identifiers
- Symbol: GATA
- Pfam: PF00320
- Pfam clan: CL0167
- InterPro: IPR000679
- PROSITE: PDOC00300
- SCOP2: 1gat / SCOPe / SUPFAM
- CDD: cd00202
Available protein structures:
- PDB: IPR000679 PF00320 (ECOD; PDBsum)
- AlphaFold: IPR000679; PF00320

In molecular biology, GATA zinc fingers are zinc-containing domains found in a number of transcription factors (including erythroid-specific transcription factor and nitrogen regulatory proteins). Some members of this class of zinc fingers specifically bind the DNA sequence (A/T)GATA(A/G) in the regulatory regions of genes., giving rise to the name of the domain. In these domains, a single zinc ion is coordinated by 4 cysteine residues. NMR studies have shown the core of the Znf to comprise 2 irregular anti-parallel beta-sheets and an alpha-helix, followed by a long loop to the C-terminal end of the finger. The N-terminal part, which includes the helix, is similar in structure, but not sequence, to the N-terminal zinc module of the glucocorticoid receptor DNA-binding domain. The helix and the loop connecting the 2 beta-sheets interact with the major groove of the DNA, while the C-terminal tail wraps around into the minor groove. Interactions between the Znf and DNA are mainly hydrophobic, explaining the preponderance of thymines in the binding site; a large number of interactions with the phosphate backbone have also been observed. Two GATA zinc fingers are found in GATA-family transcription factors. However, there are several proteins that only contain a single copy of the domain. It is also worth noting that many GATA-type Znfs (such as those found in the proteins GATAD2B and MTA1) have not been experimentally demonstrated to be DNA-binding domains. Furthermore, several GATA-type Znfs have been demonstrated to act as protein-recognition domains. For example, the N-terminal Znf of GATA1 binds specifically to a zinc finger from the transcriptional coregulator FOG1 (ZFPM1).
