= DNMT3B =

Protein-coding gene in the species Homo sapiens

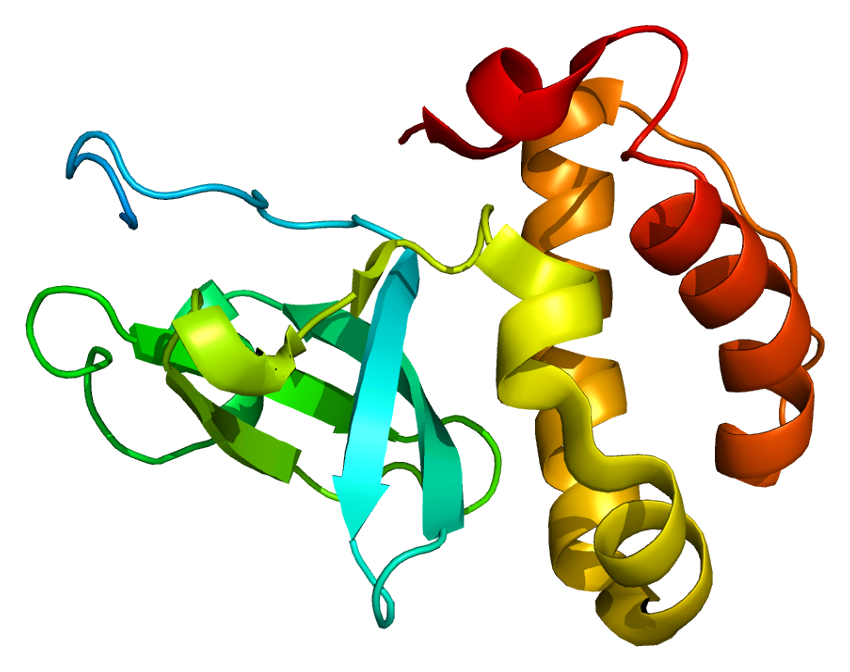

Identifiers
- Aliases: DNMT3B, ICF, ICF1, M.HsaIIIB, DNA (cytosine-5-)-methyltransferase 3 beta, DNA methyltransferase 3 beta, FSHD4
- External IDs: OMIM: 602900; MGI: 1261819; GeneCards: DNMT3B
Available structures
| PDB | Ortholog search: PDBe RCSB |
| PDB | List of PDB id codes 3QKJ, 3FLG, 5CIU |
Enzyme activity
| EC # | BRENDA | ExPASy | KEGG | MetaCyc |
|---|---|---|---|---|
| 2.1.1.37 | ↗ | ↗ | ↗ | ↗ |

Gene location (Human)
| Chr. | Chromosome 20 (human) |
| Band | 20q11.21 | Start | 32,762,385 bp |
| Band | 20q11.21 | End | 32,809,356 bp |

Gene location (Mouse)
| Chr. | Chromosome 2 (mouse) |
| Band | 2|2 H1 | Start | 153,491,370 bp |
| Band | 2|2 H1 | End | 153,529,650 bp |
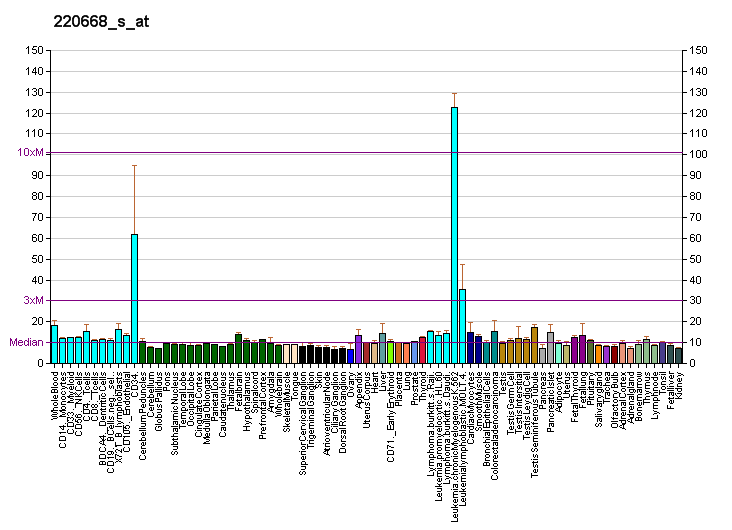
RNA expression pattern
| Bgee | Human / Mouse (ortholog); Top expressed in: secondary oocyte; hair follicle; sperm; embryo; gonad; testicle; ganglionic eminence; body of pancreas; ventricular zone; corpus epididymis / Top expressed in: epiblast; primitive streak; embryo; pelvic part of vagina; paramesonephric duct; epithelium of vagina; ejaculatory duct; tail of embryo; abdominal wall; embryo; More reference expression data |
| BioGPS | More reference expression data |
Gene ontology
| Molecular function | methyltransferase activity; transferase activity; DNA binding; transcription corepressor activity; DNA-methyltransferase activity; chromatin binding; metal ion binding; protein binding; DNA (cytosine-5-)-methyltransferase activity; DNA-binding transcription factor activity, RNA polymerase II-specific; histone deacetylase binding |
| Cellular component | cytoplasm; intracellular membrane-bounded organelle; nucleoplasm; nucleus |
| Biological process | response to ionizing radiation; C-5 methylation of cytosine; response to estradiol; response to hypoxia; cellular response to hyperoxia; negative regulation of transcription by RNA polymerase II; response to activity; cellular response to dexamethasone stimulus; response to vitamin A; DNA methylation; methylation; positive regulation of gene expression; negative regulation of gene expression, epigenetic; positive regulation of histone H3-K4 methylation; positive regulation of neuron differentiation; negative regulation of histone H3-K9 methylation; regulation of gene expression; response to caffeine; response to toxic substance; response to cocaine |
Sources:Amigo / QuickGO
Orthologs
| Databases | NCBI: entry; OMA: entry |
| Species | Human | Mouse |
| Entrez | 1789 | 13436 |
| Ensembl | ENSG00000088305 | ENSMUSG00000027478 |
| UniProt | Q9UBC3 | O88509 |
| RefSeq (mRNA) | NM_001207055; NM_001207056; NM_006892; NM_175848; NM_175849 NM_175850 | NM_001003960; NM_001003961; NM_001003963; NM_001122997; NM_001271744 NM_001271745; NM_001271746; NM_001271747; NM_010068 |
| RefSeq (protein) | NP_001193984; NP_001193985; NP_008823; NP_787044; NP_787045 NP_787046 | NP_001003960; NP_001003961; NP_001003963; NP_001116469; NP_001258673 NP_001258674; NP_001258675; NP_001258676; NP_034198 |
| Location (UCSC) | Chr 20: 32.76 – 32.81 Mb | Chr 2: 153.49 – 153.53 Mb |
| PubMed search |
- Wikidata
| View/Edit Human | View/Edit Mouse |

DNA (cytosine-5)-methyltransferase 3 beta, is an enzyme that in humans in encoded by the DNMT3B gene. Mutation in this gene are associated with immunodeficiency, centromere instability and facial anomalies syndrome.

== Function ==
CpG methylation is an epigenetic modification that is important for embryonic development, imprinting, and X-chromosome inactivation. Studies in mice have demonstrated that DNA methylation is required for mammalian development. This gene encodes a DNA methyltransferase which is thought to function in de novo methylation, rather than maintenance methylation. The protein localizes primarily to the nucleus and its expression is developmentally regulated. Eight alternatively spliced transcript variants have been described. The full length sequences of variants 4 and 5 have not been determined.

== Clinical significance ==
Immunodeficiency-centromeric instability-facial anomalies (ICF) syndrome is a result of defects in lymphocyte maturation resulting from aberrant DNA methylation caused by mutations in the DNMT3B gene.

Variants of the gene can also contribute to nicotine dependency.

== Interactions ==
DNMT3B has been shown to interact with:

- CBX5,
- DNMT1,
- DNMT3A,
- KIF4A,
- NCAPG,
- SMC2,
- SUMO1 and
- UBE2I.
