= Site-specific DNA-methyltransferase (cytosine-N4-specific) =

Class of enzymes

Identifiers
- EC no.: 2.1.1.113
- CAS no.: 169592-50-1

Databases
- IntEnz: IntEnz view
- BRENDA: BRENDA entry
- ExPASy: NiceZyme view
- KEGG: KEGG entry
- MetaCyc: metabolic pathway
- PRIAM: profile
- PDB structures: RCSB PDB PDBe PDBsum
Search
- PMC: articles
- PubMed: articles
- NCBI: proteins

Site-specific DNA-methyltransferase (cytosine-N4-specific) (EC 2.1.1.113, modification methylase, restriction-modification system; DNA[cytosine-N4]methyltransferase; m4C-forming MTase; S-adenosyl-L-methionine:DNA-cytosine 4-N-methyltransferase) is an enzyme with systematic name S-adenosyl-L-methionine:DNA-cytosine N4-methyltransferase. This enzyme catalyses the following chemical reaction:

S-adenosyl-L-methionine + DNA cytosine $\rightleftharpoons$ S-adenosyl-L-homocysteine + DNA N4-methylcytosine

This is a large group of enzymes.

== See also ==
- DNA methyltransferase
