= TET enzymes =

Family of translocation methylcytosine dioxygenases

The TET enzymes are a family of ten-eleven translocation (TET) methylcytosine dioxygenases. They are instrumental in DNA demethylation. 5-Methylcytosine (see first Figure) is a methylated form of the DNA base cytosine (C) that often regulates gene transcription and has several other functions in the genome.

DNA methylation is the addition of a methyl group to the DNA that happens at cytosine. The image shows a cytosine single ring base and a methyl group added on to the 5 carbon. In mammals, DNA methylation occurs almost exclusively at a cytosine that is followed by a guanine.

Demethylation by TET enzymes (see second Figure), can alter the regulation of transcription. The TET enzymes catalyze the hydroxylation of DNA 5-methylcytosine (5mC) to 5-hydroxymethylcytosine (5hmC), and can further catalyse oxidation of 5hmC to 5-formylcytosine (5fC) and then to 5-carboxycytosine (5caC). 5fC and 5caC can be removed from the DNA base sequence by base excision repair and replaced by cytosine in the base sequence.

Demethylation of 5-methylcytosine. Demethylation of 5-methylcytosine (5mC) in neuron DNA.

TET enzymes have central roles in DNA demethylation required during embryogenesis, gametogenesis, memory, learning, addiction and pain perception.

== TET proteins ==
The three related TET genes, TET1, TET2 and TET3 code respectively for three related mammalian proteins TET1, TET2, and TET3. All three proteins possess 5mC oxidase activity, but they differ in terms of domain architecture. TET proteins are large (~180- to 230-kDa) multidomain enzymes. All TET proteins contain a conserved double-stranded β-helix (DSBH) domain, a cysteine-rich domain, and binding sites for the cofactors Fe(II) and 2-oxoglutarate (2-OG) that together form the core catalytic region in the C terminus. In addition to their catalytic domain, full-length TET1 and TET3 proteins have an N-terminal CXXC zinc finger domain that can bind DNA. The TET2 protein lacks a CXXC domain, but the IDAX gene, that's a neighbor of the TET2 gene, encodes a CXXC4 protein. IDAX is thought to play a role in regulating TET2 activity by facilitating its recruitment to unmethylated CpGs.

=== TET isoforms ===
The three TET genes are expressed as different isoforms, including at least two isoforms of TET1, three of TET2 and three of TET3. Different isoforms of the TET genes are expressed in different cells and tissues. The full-length canonical TET1 isoform appears virtually restricted to early embryos, embryonic stem cells and primordial germ cells (PGCs). The dominant TET1 isoform in most somatic tissues, at least in the mouse, arises from alternative promoter usage which gives rise to a short transcript and a truncated protein designated TET1s. The three isoforms of TET2 arise from different promoters. They are expressed and active in embryogenesis and differentiation of hematopoietic cells. The isoforms of TET3 are the full length form TET3FL, a short form splice variant TET3s, and a form that occurs in oocytes designated TET3o. TET3o is created by alternative promoter use and contains an additional first N-terminal exon coding for 11 amino acids. TET3o only occurs in oocytes and the one cell stage of the zygote and is not expressed in embryonic stem cells or in any other cell type or adult mouse tissue tested. Whereas TET1 expression can barely be detected in oocytes and zygotes, and TET2 is only moderately expressed, the TET3 variant TET3o shows extremely high levels of expression in oocytes and zygotes, but is nearly absent at the 2-cell stage. It appears that TET3o, high in oocytes and zygotes at the one cell stage, is the major TET enzyme utilized when almost 100% rapid demethylation occurs in the paternal genome just after fertilization and before DNA replication begins (see DNA demethylation).

=== TET specificity ===
Many different proteins bind to particular TET enzymes and recruit the TETs to specific genomic locations. In some studies, further analysis is needed to determine whether the interaction per se mediates the recruitment or instead the interacting partner helps to establish a favourable chromatin environment for TET binding. TET1‑depleted and TET2‑depleted cells revealed distinct target preferences of these two enzymes, with TET1‑preferring promoters and TET2‑preferring gene bodies of highly expressed genes and enhancers.

Initiation of DNA demethylation at a CpG site

The three mammalian DNA methyltransferases (DNMTs) show a strong preference for adding a methyl group to the 5 carbon of a cytosine where a cytosine nucleotide is followed by a guanine nucleotide in the linear sequence of bases along its 5' → 3' direction (at CpG sites). This forms a 5mCpG site. More than 98% of DNA methylation occurs at CpG sites in mammalian somatic cells. Thus TET enzymes largely initiate demethylation at 5mCpG sites.

Oxoguanine glycosylase (OGG1) is one example of a protein that recruits a TET enzyme. TET1 is able to act on 5mCpG if an ROS has first acted on the guanine to form 8-hydroxy-2'-deoxyguanosine (8-OHdG or its tautomer 8-oxo-dG), resulting in a 5mCp-8-OHdG dinucleotide (see Figure). After formation of 5mCp-8-OHdG, the base excision repair enzyme OGG1 binds to the 8-OHdG lesion without immediate excision (see Figure). Adherence of OGG1 to the 5mCp-8-OHdG site recruits TET1, allowing TET1 to oxidize the 5mC adjacent to 8-OHdG. This initiates the demethylation pathway.

EGR1 is another example of a protein that recruits a TET enzyme. EGR1 has an important role in learning and memory. When a new event such as fear conditioning causes a memory to be formed, EGR1 messenger RNA is rapidly and selectively up-regulated in subsets of neurons in specific brain regions associated with learning and memory formation. TET1s is the predominant isoform of TET1 that is expressed in neurons. When EGR1 proteins are expressed, they appear to bring TET1s to about 600 sites in the neuron genome. Then EGR1 and TET1 appear to cooperate in demethylating and thereby activating the expression of genes downstream of the EGR1 binding sites in DNA.

=== TET processivity ===
TET processivity can be viewed at three levels, the physical, chemical and genetic levels. Physical processivity refers to the ability of a TET protein to slide along the DNA from one CpG site to another. An in vitro study showed that DNA-bound TET does not preferentially oxidize other CpG sites on the same DNA molecule, indicating that TET is not physically processive. Chemical processivity refers to the ability of TET to catalyze the oxidation of 5mC iteratively to 5caC without releasing its substrate. It appears that TET can work through both chemically processive and non‑processive mechanisms depending on reaction conditions. Genetic processivity refers to the genetic outcome of TET‑mediated oxidation in the genome, as shown by mapping of the oxidized bases. In mouse embryonic stem cells, many genomic regions or CpG sites are modified so that 5mC is changed to 5hmC but not to 5fC or 5caC, whereas at many otherCpG sites 5mCs are modified to 5fC or 5caC but not 5hmC, suggesting that 5mC is processed to different states at different genomic regions or CpG sites.

=== TET enzyme activity ===
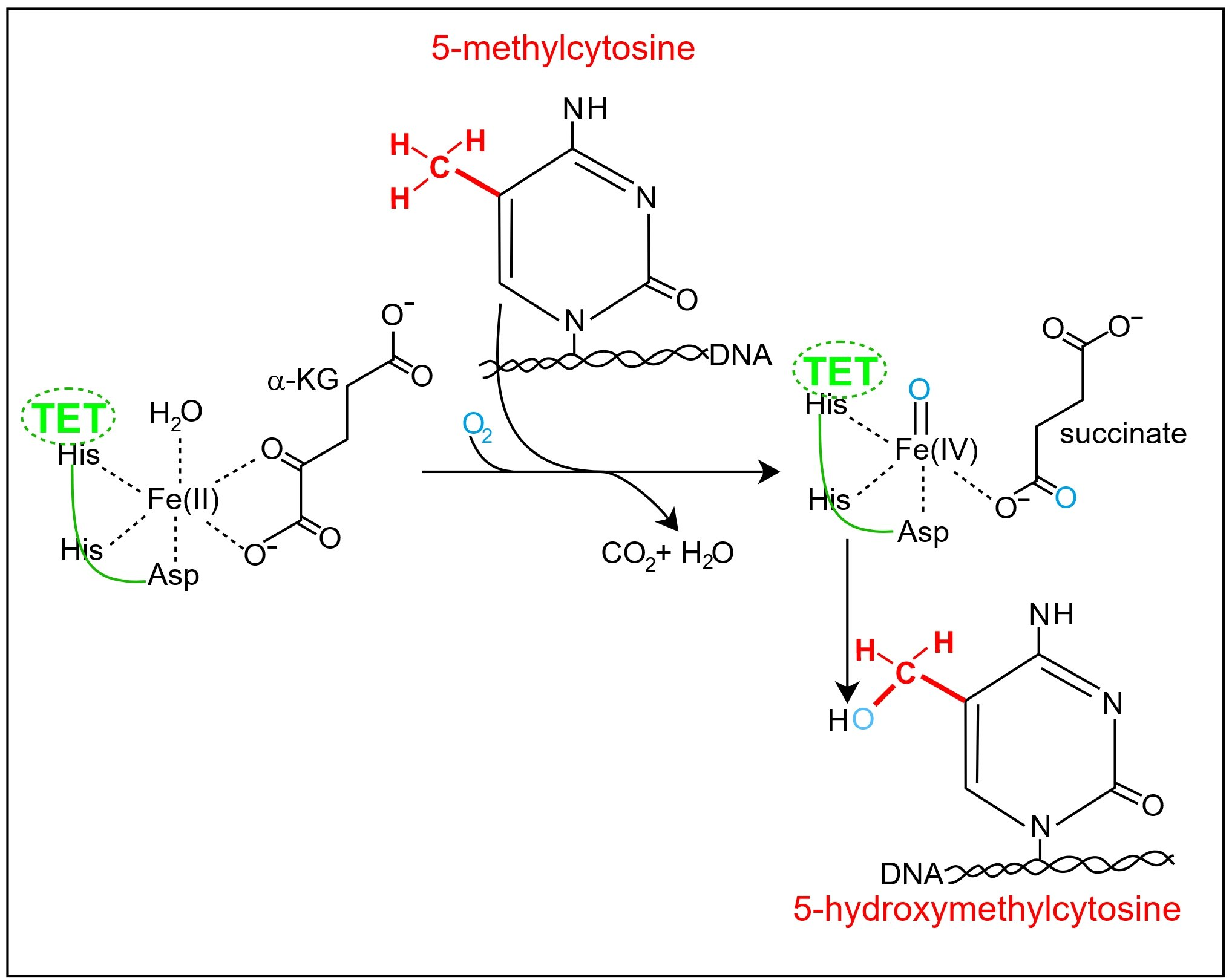
The conversion of 5-methylcytosine to 5-hydroxymethylcytosine by TET enzyme plus a-ketoglutarate & Fe(II)

TET enzymes are dioxygenases in the family of alpha-ketoglutarate-dependent hydroxylases. A TET enzyme is an alpha-ketoglutarate (α-KG) dependent dioxygenase that catalyses an oxidation reaction by incorporating a single oxygen atom from molecular oxygen (O_{2}) into its substrate, 5-methylcytosine in DNA (5mC), to produce the product 5-hydroxymethylcytosine in DNA. This conversion is coupled with the oxidation of the co-substrate α-KG to succinate and carbon dioxide (see Figure).

The first step involves the binding of α-KG and 5-methylcytosine to the TET enzyme active site. The TET enzymes each harbor a core catalytic domain with a double-stranded β-helix fold that contains the crucial metal-binding residues found in the family of Fe(II)/α-KG- dependent oxygenases. α-KG coordinates as a bidentate ligand (connected at two points) to Fe(II) (see Figure), while the 5mC is held by a noncovalent force in close proximity. The TET active site contains a highly conserved triad motif, in which the catalytically-essential Fe(II) is held by two histidine residues and one aspartic acid residue (see Figure). The triad binds to one face of the Fe center, leaving three labile sites available for binding α-KG and O_{2} (see Figure). TET then acts to convert 5-methylcytosine to 5-hydroxymethylcytosine while α-ketoglutarate is converted to succinate and CO_{2}.

=== Alternate TET activities ===
The TET proteins also have activities that are independent of DNA demethylation. These include, for instance, TET2 interaction with O-linked N-acetylglucosamine (O-GlcNAc) transferase to promote histone O-GlcN acylation to affect transcription of target genes.

== TET functions ==
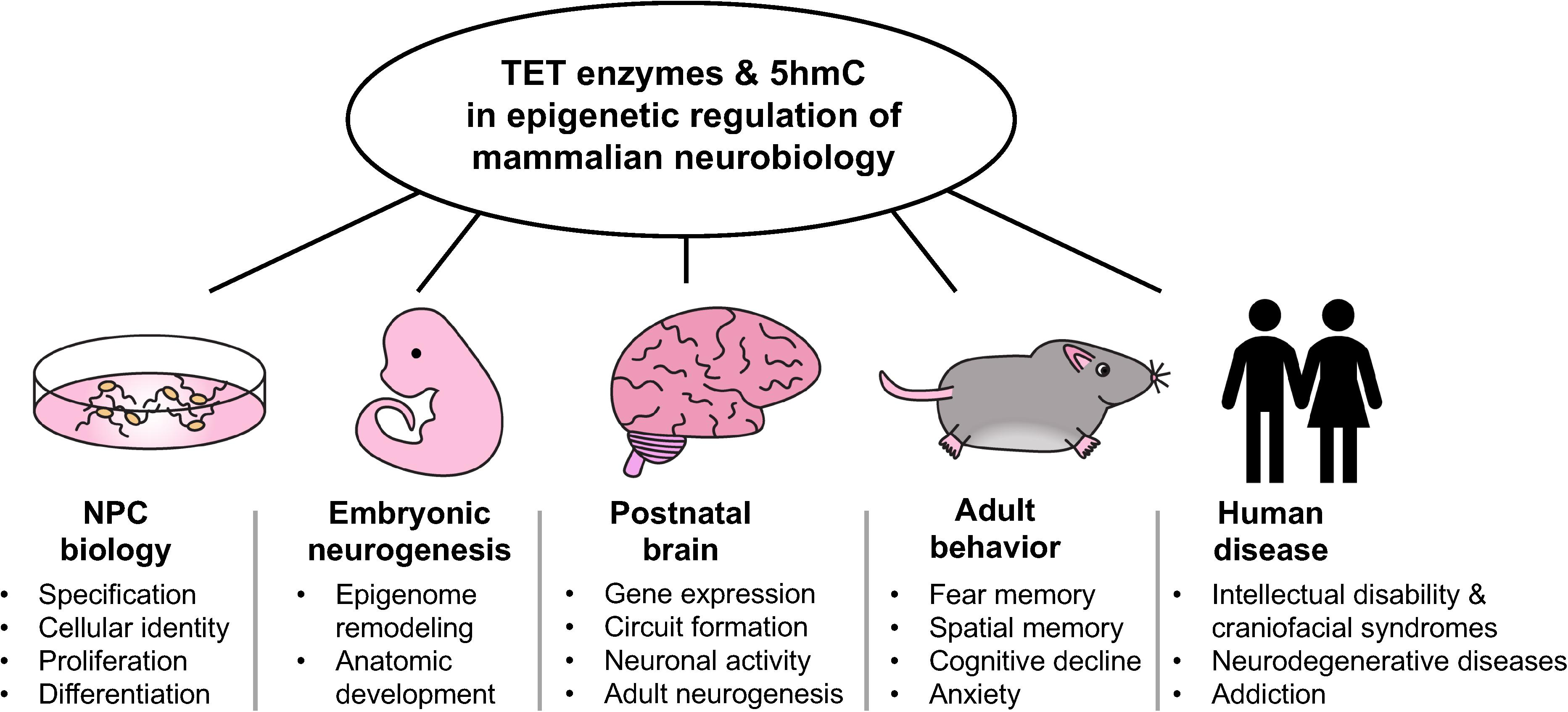
Summary of the role of TET enzymes and 5-hydroxymethylcytosine (5hmC) in mammalian neurobiology. Note: Neural progenitor cell (NPC)

=== Early embryogenesis ===
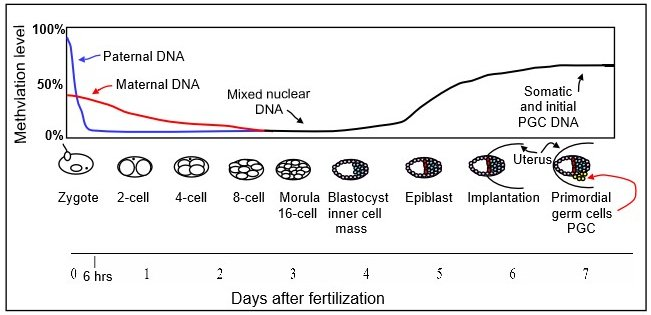
Methylation levels during mouse early embryonic development.

The mouse sperm genome is 80–90% methylated at its CpG sites in DNA, amounting to about 20 million methylated sites. After fertilization, early in the first day of embryogenesis, the paternal chromosomes are almost completely demethylated in six hours by an active TET-dependent process, before DNA replication begins (blue line in Figure).

Demethylation of the maternal genome occurs by a different process. In the mature oocyte, about 40% of its CpG sites in DNA are methylated. In the pre-implantation embryo up to the blastocyst stage (see Figure), the only methyltransferase present is an isoform of DNMT1 designated DNMT1o. It appears that demethylation of the maternal chromosomes largely takes place by blockage of the methylating enzyme DNMT1o from entering the nucleus except briefly at the 8 cell stage (see DNA demethylation). The maternal-origin DNA thus undergoes passive demethylation by dilution of the methylated maternal DNA during replication (red line in Figure). The morula (at the 16 cell stage), has only a small amount of DNA methylation (black line in Figure).

=== Gametogenesis ===
The newly formed primordial germ cells (PGC) in the implanted embryo devolve from the somatic cells at about day 7 of embryogenesis in the mouse. At this point the PGCs have high levels of methylation. These cells migrate from the epiblast toward the gonadal ridge. As reviewed by Messerschmidt et al., the majority of PGCs are arrested in the G_{2} phase of the cell cycle while they migrate toward the hindgut during embryo days 7.5 to 8.5. Then demethylation of the PGCs takes place in two waves. There is both passive and active, TET-dependent demethylation of the primordial germ cells. At day 9.5 the primordial germ cells begin to rapidly replicate going from about 200 PGCs at embryo day 9.5 to about 10,000 PGCs at day 12.5. During days 9.5 to 12.5 DNMT3a and DNMT3b are repressed and DNMT1 is present in the nucleus at a high level. But DNMT1 is unable to methylate cytosines during days 9.5 to 12.5 because the UHRF1 gene (also known as NP95) is repressed and UHRF1 is an essential protein needed to recruit DNMT1 to replication foci where maintenance DNA methylation takes place. This is a passive, dilution form of demethylation.

In addition, from embryo day 9.5 to 13.5 there is an active form of demethylation. As indicated in the Figure of the demethylation pathway above, two enzymes are central to active demethylation. These are a ten-eleven translocation (TET) methylcytosine dioxygenase and thymine-DNA glycosylase (TDG). One particular TET enzyme, TET1, and TDG are present at high levels from embryo day 9.5 to 13.5, and are employed in active TET-dependent demethylation during gametogenesis. PGC genomes display the lowest levels of DNA methylation of any cells in the entire life cycle of the mouse by embryonic day 13.5.

=== Learning and memory ===
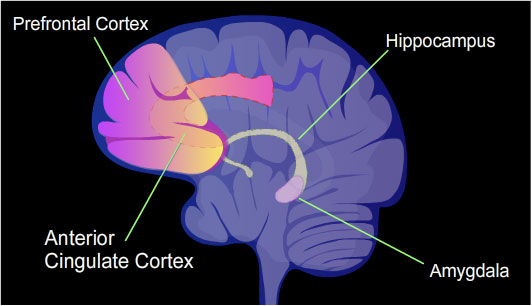
Brain regions involved in memory formation

Learning and memory have levels of permanence, differing from other mental processes such as thought, language, and consciousness, which are temporary in nature. Learning and memory can be either accumulated slowly (multiplication tables) or rapidly (touching a hot stove), but once attained, can be recalled into conscious use for a long time. Rats subjected to one instance of contextual fear conditioning create an especially strong long-term memory. At 24 hours after training, 9.17% of the genes in the genomes of rat hippocampus neurons were found to be differentially methylated. This included more than 2,000 differentially methylated genes at 24 hours after training, with over 500 genes being demethylated. Similar results to that in the rat hippocampus were also obtained in mice with contextual fear conditioning.

The hippocampus region of the brain is where contextual fear memories are first stored (see Figure), but this storage is transient and does not remain in the hippocampus. In rats contextual fear conditioning is abolished when the hippocampus is subjected to hippocampectomy just one day after conditioning, but rats retain a considerable amount of contextual fear when hippocampectomy is delayed by four weeks. In mice, examined at 4 weeks after conditioning, the hippocampus methylations and demethylations were reversed (the hippocampus is needed to form memories but memories are not stored there) while substantial differential CpG methylation and demethylation occurred in cortical neurons during memory maintenance. There were 1,223 differentially methylated genes in the anterior cingulate cortex (see Figure) of mice four weeks after contextual fear conditioning. Thus, while there were many methylations in the hippocampus shortly after memory was formed, all these hippocampus methylations were demethylated as soon as four weeks later.

Li et al. reported one example of the relationship between expression of a TET protein, demethylation and memory while using extinction training. Extinction training is the disappearance of a previously learned behavior when the behavior is not reinforced.

A comparison between infralimbic prefrontal cortex (ILPFC) neuron samples derived from mice trained to fear an auditory cue and extinction-trained mice revealed dramatic experience-dependent genome-wide differences in the accumulation of 5-hmC in the ILPFC in response to learning. Extinction training led to a significant increase in TET3 messenger RNA levels within cortical neurons. TET3 was selectively activated within the adult neo-cortex in an experience-dependent manner.

A short hairpin RNA (shRNA) is an artificial RNA molecule with a tight hairpin turn that can be used to silence target gene expression via RNA interference. Mice trained in the presence of TET3-targeted shRNA showed a significant impairment in fear extinction memory.

=== Addiction ===
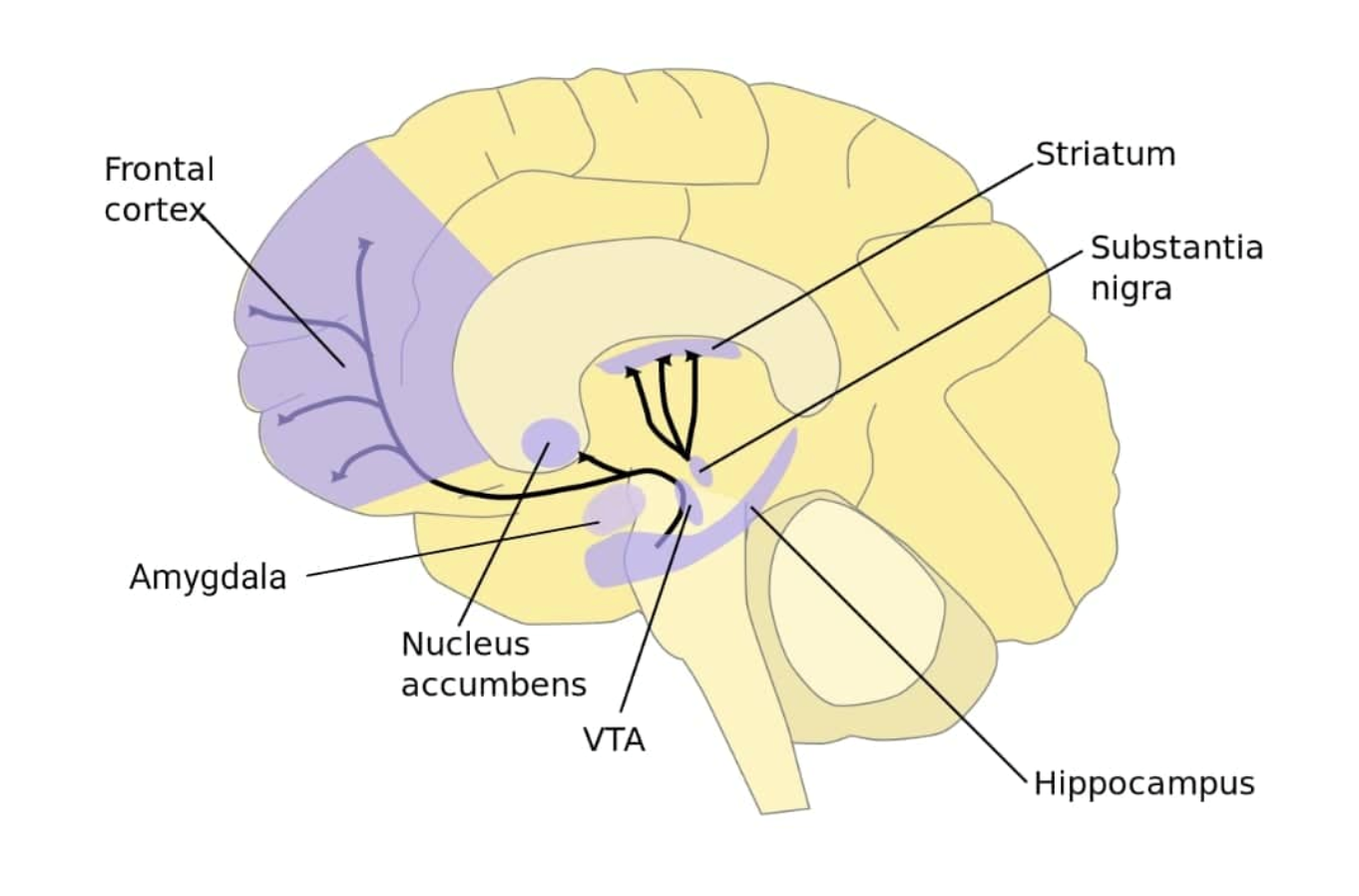
. Brain structures connected to addiction

The nucleus accumbens (NAc) has a significant role in addiction. In the nucleus accumbens of mice, repeated cocaine exposure resulted in reduced TET1 messenger RNA (mRNA) and reduced TET1 protein expression. Similarly, there was a ~40% decrease in TET1 mRNA in the NAc of human cocaine addicts examined postmortem.

As indicated above in learning and memory, a short hairpin RNA (shRNA) is an artificial RNA molecule with a tight hairpin turn that can be used to silence target gene expression via RNA interference. Feng et al. injected shRNA targeted to TET1 in the NAc of mice. This could reduce TET1 expression in the same manner as reduction of TET1 expression with cocaine exposure. They then used an indirect measure of addiction, conditioned place preference. Conditioned place preference can measure the amount of time an animal spends in an area that has been associated with cocaine exposure, and this can indicate an addiction to cocaine. Reduced Tet1 expression caused by shRNA injected into the NAc robustly enhanced cocaine place conditioning.

=== Pain (nociception) ===
As described in the article Nociception, nociception is the sensory nervous system's response to harmful stimuli, such as a toxic chemical applied to a tissue. In nociception, chemical stimulation of sensory nerve cells called nociceptors produces a signal that travels along a chain of nerve fibers via the spinal cord to the brain. Nociception triggers a variety of physiological and behavioral responses and usually results in a subjective experience, or perception, of pain.

Work by Pan et al. first showed that TET1 and TET3 proteins are normally present in the spinal cords of mice. They used a pain inducing model of intra plantar injection of 5% formalin into the dorsal surface of the mouse hindpaw and measured time of licking of the hindpaw as a measure of induced pain. Protein expression of TET1 and TET3 increased by 152% and 160%, respectively, by 2 hours after formalin injection. Forced reduction of expression of TET1 or TET3 by spinal injection of Tet1-siRNA or Tet3-siRNA for three consecutive days before formalin injection alleviated the mouse perception of pain. On the other hand, forced overexpression of TET1 or TET3 for 2 consecutive days significantly produced pain-like behavior as evidenced by a decrease in the mouse of the thermal pain threshold.

They further showed that the nociceptive pain effects occurred through TET mediated conversion of 5-methylcytosine to 5-hydroxymethylcytosine in the promoter of a microRNA designated miR-365-3p, thus increasing its expression. This microRNA, in turn, ordinarily targets (decreases expression of) the messenger RNA of Kcnh2, that codes for a protein known as K_{v}11.1 or KCNH2. KCNH2 is the alpha subunit of a potassium ion channel in the central nervous system. Forced decrease in expression of TET1 or TET3 through pre-injection of siRNA reversed the decrease of KCNH2 protein in formalin-treated mice.

=== Cellular senescence ===
A 2025 iScience study reported that experimental suppression of the α-ketoglutarate (AKG)–TET axis in cultured human fibroblasts and peripheral blood mononuclear cells induced multiple senescence-associated features, including increased reactive oxygen species, inflammatory signaling, DNA damage markers, and reduced proliferation. In the same study, restoring AKG availability or increasing TET1 expression reduced these senescence-associated markers and partially restored proliferative activity in vitro.

Because these findings were obtained in cell culture, their broader physiological significance remains to be established.
