= CG suppression =

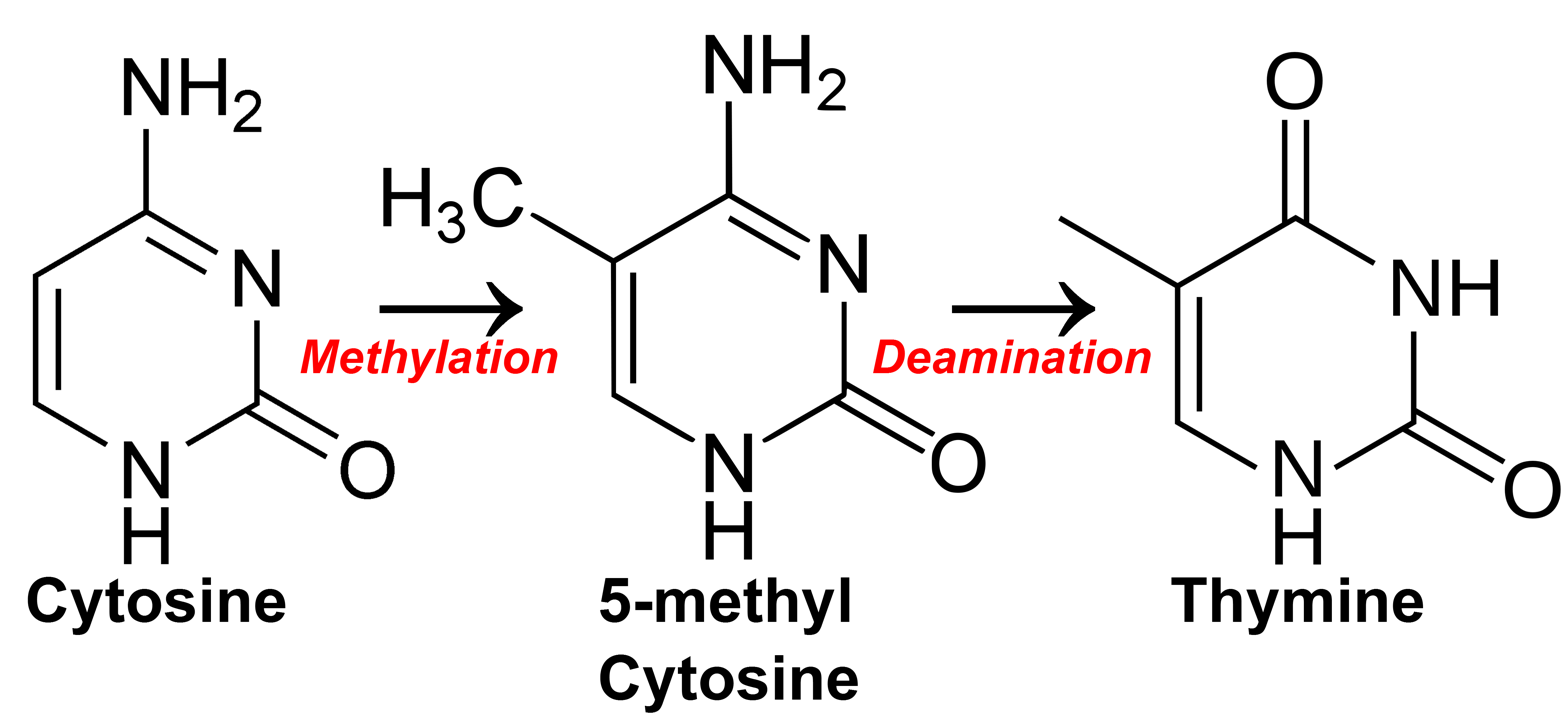
How methylation of CpG sites followed by spontaneous deamination leads to a lack of CpG sites in methylated DNA. As a result residual CpG islands are created in areas where methylation is rare, and CpG sites stick.

CG suppression is a term for the phenomenon that CG dinucleotides are very uncommon in most portions of vertebrate genomes.

In adult somatic tissues, cytosine residues may be methylated, and this occurs almost exclusively within a symmetric CpG context. Methylated C residues spontaneously deaminate to form T residues; hence CpG dinucleotides steadily mutate to TpG dinucleotides, which gives rise to the under-representation of CpG dinucleotides in the human genome (they occur at only 21% of the expected frequency). (On the other hand, spontaneous deamination of unmethylated C residues gives rise to U residues, a mutation that is quickly recognized and repaired by the cell).

In human and mouse, CGs are the least frequent dinucleotide, making up less than 1% of all dinucleotides. GCs are the second most infrequent, making up more than 4% of all dinucleotides, so CGs are more than fourfold less frequent than all other dinucleotides.

== See also ==
- CpG island
