= PRMT6 =

Protein-coding gene in humans

Identifiers
- Aliases: PRMT6, HRMT1L6, protein arginine methyltransferase 6
- External IDs: OMIM: 608274; MGI: 2139971; GeneCards: PRMT6
Available structures
PDB	Ortholog search: PDBe RCSB
PDB	List of PDB id codes 4HC4, 4QPP, 4QQK, 4Y2H, 4Y30, 5EGS, 5E8R, 5HZM
Enzyme activity
EC #	BRENDA	ExPASy	KEGG	MetaCyc
2.1.1.319	↗	↗	↗	↗
2.1.1.321	↗	↗	↗	↗

Gene location (Human)
Chr.	Chromosome 1 (human)
Band	1p13.3	Start	107,056,674 bp
Band	1p13.3	End	107,067,636 bp

Gene location (Mouse)
Chr.	Chromosome 3 (mouse)
Band	3|3 F3	Start	110,153,425 bp
Band	3|3 F3	End	110,158,314 bp
RNA expression pattern
Bgee	Human / Mouse (ortholog); Top expressed in: gonad; islet of Langerhans; palpebral conjunctiva; right adrenal cortex; mucosa of sigmoid colon; metanephros; testicle; left adrenal gland; left adrenal cortex; prefrontal cortex / Top expressed in: renal corpuscle; medullary collecting duct; spermatocyte; endocardial cushion; epiblast; embryo; primitive streak; yolk sac; tail of embryo; right kidney; More reference expression data
BioGPS	n/a
Gene ontology
Molecular function	methyltransferase activity; transferase activity; histone methyltransferase activity; protein-arginine omega-N monomethyltransferase activity; histone methyltransferase activity (H4-R3 specific); histone binding; protein-arginine omega-N asymmetric methyltransferase activity; chromatin binding; histone methyltransferase activity (H2A-R3 specific); histone methyltransferase activity (H3-R2 specific); protein binding; protein-arginine N-methyltransferase activity; histone-arginine N-methyltransferase activity
Cellular component	nucleoplasm; nucleus; nucleolus; cytosol
Biological process	regulation of transcription, DNA-templated; negative regulation of transcription by RNA polymerase II; transcription, DNA-templated; cellular response to DNA damage stimulus; cellular senescence; methylation; peptidyl-arginine methylation, to asymmetrical-dimethyl arginine; histone methylation; viral process; negative regulation of transcription, DNA-templated; DNA repair; base-excision repair; protein methylation; histone H4-R3 methylation; regulation of megakaryocyte differentiation; chromatin organization; histone H3-R2 methylation; peptidyl-arginine N-methylation; negative regulation of histone H3-K4 methylation; regulation of signal transduction by p53 class mediator; histone arginine methylation
Sources:Amigo / QuickGO
Orthologs
Databases	NCBI: entry; OMA: entry
Species	Human	Mouse
Entrez	55170	99890
Ensembl	ENSG00000198890	ENSMUSG00000049300
UniProt	Q96LA8	Q6NZB1
RefSeq (mRNA)	NM_018137	NM_178891
RefSeq (protein)	NP_060607	NP_849222
Location (UCSC)	Chr 1: 107.06 – 107.07 Mb	Chr 3: 110.15 – 110.16 Mb
PubMed search
- Wikidata
View/Edit Human	View/Edit Mouse

Protein arginine N-methyltransferase 6 is an enzyme that in humans is encoded by the PRMT6 gene.

Protein arginine N-methyltransferases, such as PRMT6, catalyze the sequential transfer of a methyl group from S-adenosyl-L-methionine to the side chain nitrogens of arginine residues within proteins to form methylated arginine derivatives and S-adenosyl-L-homocysteine.[supplied by OMIM]
