= Flap endonuclease =

Flap endonucleases (FENs, also known as 5' durgs in older references) are a class of nucleolytic enzymes that act as both 5'-3' exonucleases and structure-specific endonucleases on specialised DNA structures that occur during the biological processes of DNA replication, DNA repair, and DNA recombination. Flap endonucleases have been identified in eukaryotes, prokaryotes, archaea, and some viruses. Organisms can have more than one FEN homologue; this redundancy may give an indication of the importance of these enzymes. In prokaryotes, the FEN enzyme is found as an N-terminal domain of DNA polymerase I, but some prokaryotes appear to encode a second homologue.

The endonuclease activity of FENs was initially identified as acting on a DNA duplex which has a single-stranded 5' overhang on one of the strands (termed a "5' flap", hence the name flap endonuclease). FENs catalyse hydrolytic cleavage of the phosphodiester bond at the junction of single- and double-stranded DNA. Some FENs can also act as 5'-3' exonucleases on the 5' terminus of the flap strand and on 'nicked' DNA substrates.

Protein structure models based on X-ray crystallography data suggest that FENs have a flexible arch created by two α-helices through which the single 5' strand of the 5' flap structure can thread.

Flap endonucleases have been used in biotechnology, for example the Taqman PCR assay and the Invader Assay for mutation and single nucleotide polymorphism (SNP) detection.

== See also ==
- Endonucleases
