= Fear conditioning =

Behavioral paradigm in which organisms learn to predict aversive events

Pavlovian fear conditioning is a behavioral paradigm in which organisms learn to predict aversive events. It is a form of learning in which an aversive stimulus (e.g. an electrical shock) is associated with a particular neutral context (e.g., a room) or neutral stimulus (e.g., a tone), resulting in the expression of fear responses to the originally neutral stimulus or context. This can be done by pairing the neutral stimulus with an aversive stimulus (e.g., an electric shock, loud noise, or unpleasant odor). Eventually, the neutral stimulus alone can elicit the state of fear. In the vocabulary of classical conditioning, the neutral stimulus or context is the "conditional stimulus" (CS), the aversive stimulus is the "unconditional stimulus" (US), and the fear is the "conditional response" (CR).

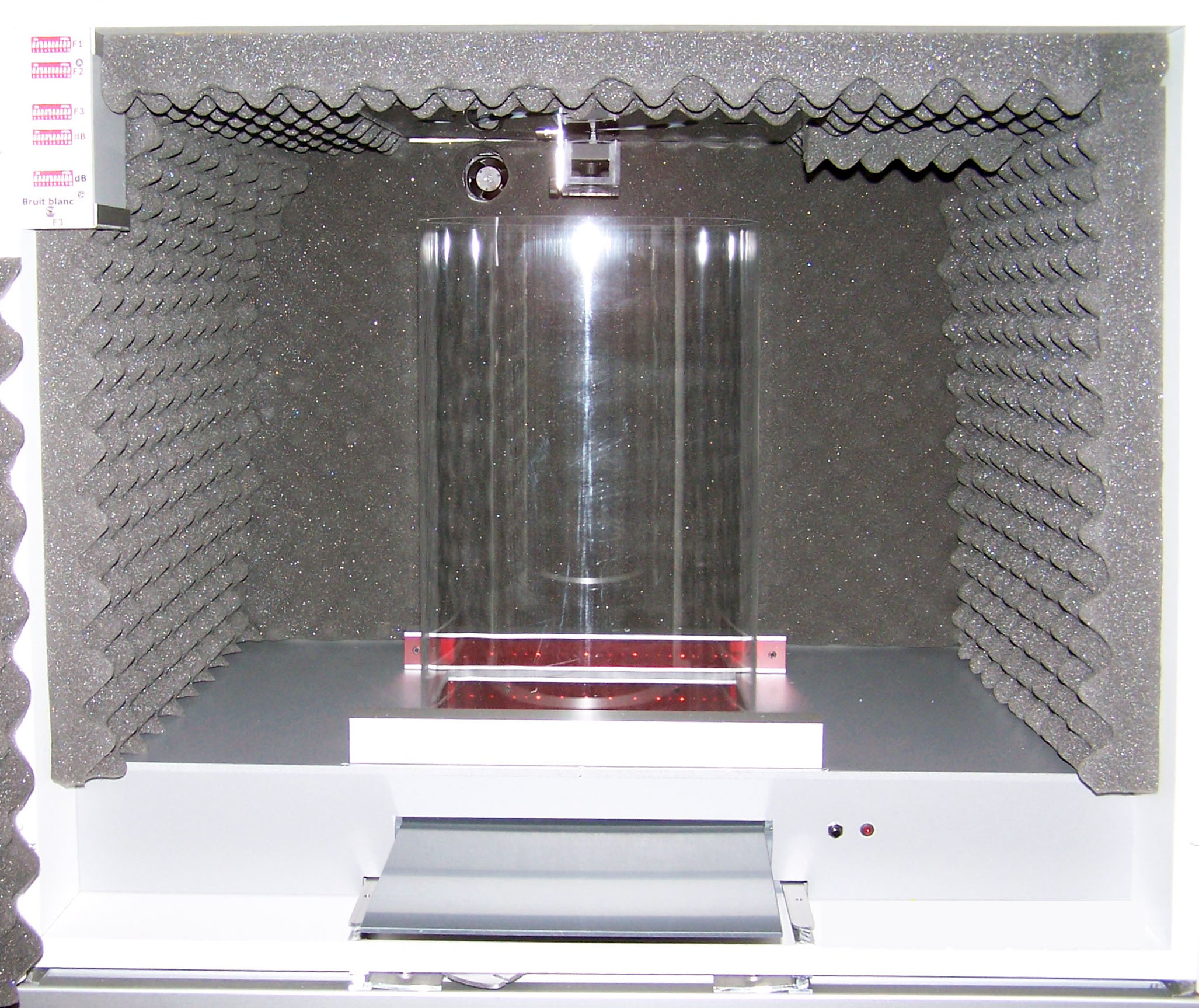
Fear conditioning apparatus for mice equipped with a sound, a foot shock and an activity sensor with photobeams to measure freezing. Environment context can be changed. This apparatus is also used for PTSD studies.

Fear conditioning has been studied in numerous species, from snails to humans. In humans, conditioned fear is often measured with verbal report and galvanic skin response. In other animals, conditioned fear is often measured with freezing (a period of watchful immobility) or fear potentiated startle (the augmentation of the startle reflex by a fearful stimulus). Changes in heart rate, breathing, and muscle responses via electromyography can also be used to measure conditioned fear. A number of theorists have argued that conditioned fear coincides substantially with the mechanisms, both functional and neural, of clinical anxiety disorders. Research into the acquisition, consolidation and extinction of conditioned fear promises to inform new drug based and psychotherapeutic treatments for an array of pathological conditions such as dissociation, phobias and post-traumatic stress disorder.

Scientists have discovered that there is a set of brain connections that determine how fear memories are stored and recalled. While studying rats' ability to recall fear memories, researchers found a newly identified brain circuit is involved. Initially, the pre-limbic prefrontal cortex (PL) and the basolateral amygdala (BLA) were identified in memory recall. A week later, the central amygdala (CeA) and the paraventricular nucleus of the thalamus (PVT) were identified in memory recall, which are responsible for maintaining fear memories. This study shows how there are shifting circuits between short term recall and long term recall of fear memories. There is no change in behavior or response, only change in where the memory was recalled from.

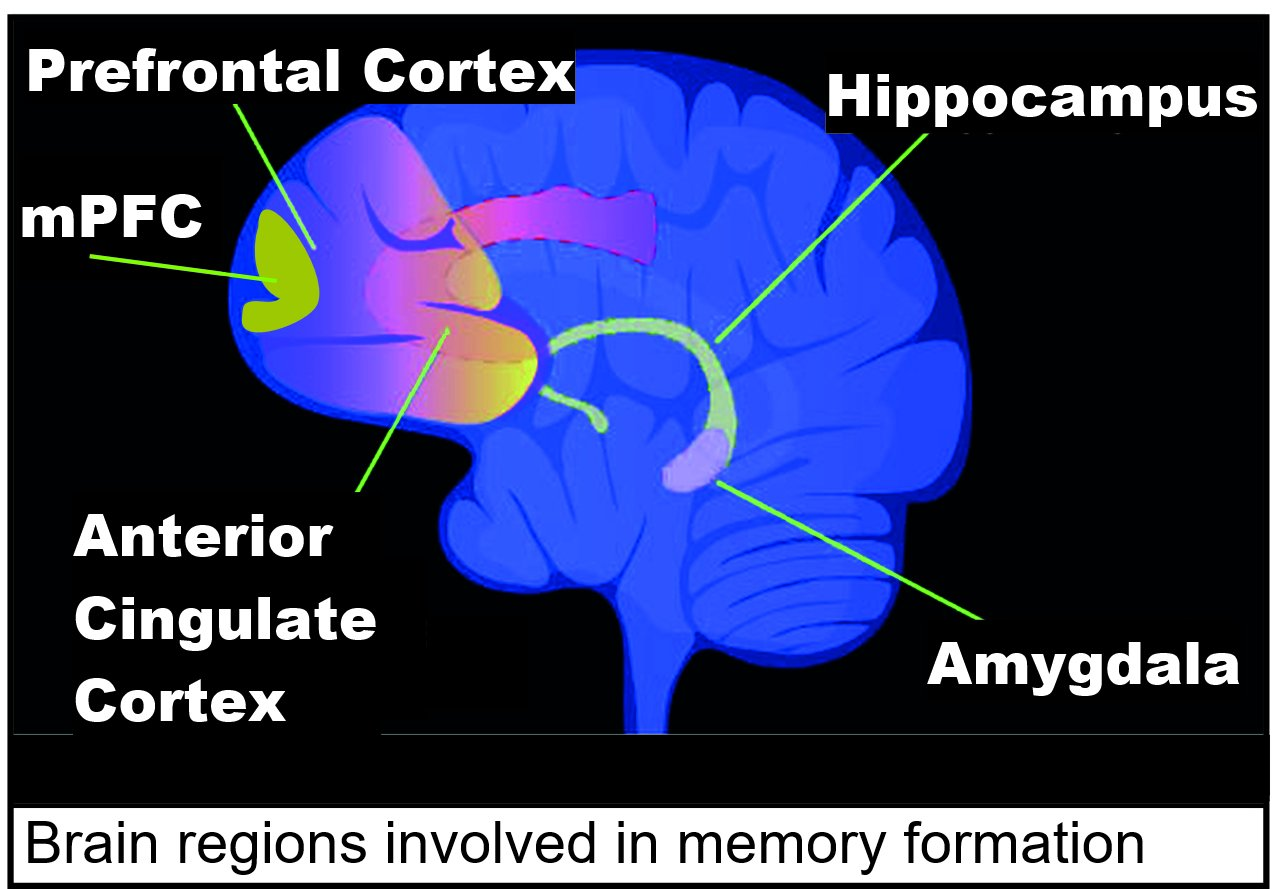
including medial prefrontal cortex (mPFC)

In addition to the amygdala, the hippocampus and the anterior cingulate cortex are important in fear conditioning. Fear conditioning in the rat is stored at early times in the hippocampus, with alterations in hippocampal gene expression observed at 1 hour and 24 hours after the event. In the mouse, changed gene expression is also seen in the hippocampus at one hour and 24 hours after fear conditioning. These changes are transient in the hippocampal neurons, and almost none are present in the hippocampus after four weeks. By 4 weeks after the event, the memory of the fear conditioning event is more permanently stored in the anterior cingulate cortex.

== Neurobiology ==
=== Neuronal gene expression ===
As shown in the rodent brain, neuronal gene expression is dynamically changed in response to fear conditioning. In particular, the expressions of immediate early genes (IEGs) such as Egr1, c-Fos, and Arc are rapidly and selectively up-regulated in subsets of neurons in specific brain regions associated with learning and memory formation.

A review in 2022 describes multiple steps in up-regulating the IEGs in neurons in the hippocampus during fear conditioning. IEGs are similarly up-regulated in the amygdala during fear conditioning. The multiple steps in up-regulating IEGs include activation of transcription factors, formation of chromatin loops, interaction of enhancers with promoters in chromatin loops and topoisomerase II beta-initiated temporary DNA double-strand breaks.

At least two IEGs up-regulated by fear conditioning, Egr1 and Dnmt3A2 (shown to be an IEG by Oliveira et al.) affect DNA methylation, and thus expression, of many genes. Up-regulated EGR1 proteins associate with pre-existing nuclear TET1 proteins, and the EGR1 proteins bring TET1 proteins to hundreds of genes, allowing TET1 to initiate DNA demethylation of those genes. DNMT3A2 protein is a de novo DNA methyltransferase, adding methylation to cytosines in DNA. Expression of DNMT3A2 proteins in hippocampus neurons in culture preferentially targeted the addition of new methylation to more than 200 genes involved in synaptic plasticity. Expressions of IEGs are a source of the dynamic changes in subsequent neuronal gene expression in response to fear conditioning.

=== Amygdala ===
Fear conditioning is thought to depend upon an area of the brain called the amygdala. The amygdala is involved in acquisition, storage, and expression of conditioned fear memory. Lesion studies have revealed that lesions drilled into the amygdala before fear conditioning prevent the acquisition of the conditioned response of fear, and lesions drilled in the amygdala after conditioning cause conditioned responses to be forgotten. Electrophysiological recordings from the amygdala have demonstrated that cells in that region undergo long-term potentiation (LTP), a form of synaptic plasticity believed to underlie learning. Pharmacological studies, synaptic studies, and human studies also implicate the amygdala as chiefly responsible for fear learning and memory. Additionally, inhibition of neurons in the amygdala disrupts fear acquisition, while stimulation of those neurons can drive fear-related behaviors, such as freezing behavior in rodents. This indicates that proper function of the amygdala is both necessary for fear conditioning and sufficient to drive fear behaviors. The amygdala is not exclusively the fear center, but also an area for responding to various environmental stimuli. Several studies have shown that when faced with unpredictable neutral stimuli, amygdala activity increases. Therefore, even in situations of uncertainty and not necessarily fear, the amygdala plays a role in alerting other brain regions that encourage safety and survival responses.

In the mid-1950s Lawrence Weiskrantz demonstrated that monkeys with lesions of amygdala failed to avoid an aversive shock while the normal monkeys learned to avoid them. He concluded that a key function of the amygdala was to connect external stimuli with aversive consequences. Following Weiskrantz's discovery many researchers used avoidance conditioning to study neural mechanisms of fear.

Joseph E. LeDoux has been instrumental in elucidating the amygdala's role in fear conditioning. He was one of the first to show that the amygdala undergoes long-term potentiation during fear conditioning, and that ablation of amygdala cells disrupts both learning and expression of fear.

=== Hippocampus ===
Fear conditioning can also involve the hippocampus, which has bidirectional anatomical connections to the amygdala. Consistent with a general role of the hippocampus in contextual and spatial learning, the hippocampus has been particularly linked to fear conditioning to contexts. However, there is also evidence for the hippocampus, especially the ventral hippocampus, to be required for fear conditioning that does not involve contextual stimuli, e.g. fear conditioning to a tone.

The hippocampus is one of the brain regions that undergoes major alterations in gene expression after contextual fear conditioning. Contextual fear conditioning applied to a rat causes about 500 genes to be up-regulated (possibly due to DNA demethylation of CpG sites) and about 1,000 genes to be down-regulated (observed to be correlated with DNA methylation at CpG sites in promoter regions) (see Regulation of transcription in learning and memory). By 24 hours after the event, 9.17% of the genes in the genomes of rat hippocampus neurons are differentially methylated. The pattern of induced and repressed genes within hippocampal neurons appears to provide a molecular basis for forming the early transient memory of contextual fear conditioning in the hippocampus. When similar contextual fear conditioning was applied to a mouse, one hour after contextual fear conditioning there were 675 demethylated genes and 613 hypermethylated genes in the hippocampus region of the mouse brain. These changes were transient in the hippocampal neurons, and almost none of these DNA methylation alterations were present in the hippocampus after four weeks. However, in mice subjected to contextual fear conditioning, after four weeks there were more than 1,000 differentially methylated genes and more than 1,000 differentially expressed genes in the mouse anterior cingulate cortex where long-term memories are stored.

=== Molecular mechanisms ===
==== Double-strand breaks ====
More than 100 DNA double-strand breaks occur, both in the hippocampus and in the medial prefrontal cortex (mPFC), in two peaks, at 10 minutes and at 30 minutes after contextual fear conditioning. This appears to be earlier than the DNA methylations and demethylations of neuron DNA in the hippocampus that were measured at one hour and 24 hours after contextual fear conditioning (described above in the section Hippocampus).

The double strand breaks occur at known memory-related immediate early genes (among other genes) in neurons after neuron activation. These double-strand breaks allow the genes to be transcribed and then translated into active proteins.

One immediate early gene newly transcribed after a double-strand break is EGR1. EGR1 is an important transcription factor in memory formation. It has an essential role in brain neuron epigenetic reprogramming. EGR1 recruits the TET1 protein that initiates a pathway of DNA demethylation. Removing DNA methylation marks allows the activation of downstream genes (see Regulation of gene expression#Regulation of transcription in learning and memory. EGR1 brings TET1 to promoter sites of genes that need to be demethylated and activated (transcribed) during memory formation. EGR-1, together with TET1, is employed in programming the distribution of DNA demethylation sites on brain DNA during memory formation and in long-term neuronal plasticity.

DNMT3A2 is another immediate early gene whose expression in neurons can be induced by sustained synaptic activity. DNMTs bind to DNA and methylate cytosines at particular locations in the genome. If this methylation is prevented by DNMT inhibitors, then memories do not form. If DNMT3A2 is over-expressed in the hippocampus of young adult mice it converts a weak learning experience into long-term memory and also enhances fear memory formation.

==== Intra-amygdala circuit ====
Neurons in the basolateral amygdala are responsible for the formation of conditioned fear memory. These neurons project to neurons in the central amygdala for the expression of a conditioned fear response. Damage to these areas in the amygdala would result in disruption of the expression of conditioned fear responses. Lesions in the basolateral amygdala have shown severe deficits in the expression of conditioned fear responses. Lesions in the central amygdala have shown mild deficits in the expression of conditioned fear responses.

===== NMDA receptors and glutamate =====
One of the major neurotransmitters involved in conditioned fear learning is glutamate. It has been suggested that NMDA receptors (NMDARs) in the amygdala are necessary for fear memory acquisition, because disruption of NMDAR function disrupts development of fear responses in rodents. In addition, the associative nature of fear conditioning is reflected in the role of NMDARs as coincident detectors, where NMDAR activation requires simultaneous depolarization by US inputs combined with concurrent CS activation.

Dopamine

In addition to glutamate, dopamine is involved in fear conditioning and extinction. Dopamine neurons in the ventral tegmental area, substantia nigra pars compacta, and dorsal raphe nucleus play a critical role in forming, consolidating, and retrieving fear-related memories. The amygdala is involved in the initial expression and acquisition of fear, while dopamine receptor activation in the medial prefrontal cortex and striatum works to link fear expression to CS.

=== Epigenetics ===
Conditioned fear may be inherited transgenerationally. In one experiment, mice were conditioned to fear an acetophenone odor and then set up to breed subsequent generations of mice. Those subsequent generations of mice also showed a behavioral sensitivity to acetophenone, which was accompanied by neuroanatomical and epigenetic changes that are believed to have been inherited from the parents' gametes.

== Across development ==
The learning involved in conditioned fear, as well as the underlying neurobiology, changes dramatically from infancy, across childhood and adolescence, into adulthood and aging. Specifically, infant animals show an inability to develop fear associations, whereas their adult counterparts develop fear memories much more readily.

Previous research has indicated that adolescents show hampered fear extinction learning compared to children and adults. This finding may have clinical implications, as one of the most widely used treatments for anxiety disorders is exposure based therapy, which builds on the principles of fear extinction. The exact mechanisms underlying the developmental differences in fear extinction learning have not yet been discovered, although it has been suggested that age related differences in connectivity between the amygdala and medial prefrontal cortex can be one of the biological mechanisms underpinning the developmental change in fear extinction learning.

=== Prior experience with stress ===
A history of stressors preceding a traumatic event increases the effect of fear conditioning in rodents. This phenomenon, named Stress-Enhanced Fear Learning (SEFL), has been demonstrated in both young (e.g. Poulos et al. 2014) and adult (e.g. Rau et al. 2009) rodents. Biological mechanisms underpinning SEFL have not yet been made clear, though it has been associated with a rise in corticosterone, the stress hormone, following the initial stressor.

== See also ==
- Classical conditioning
- Extinction (psychology)
- Eyeblink conditioning
- Fear processing in the brain
- Infralimbic cortex
- Ivan Pavlov
- Ventromedial prefrontal cortex
