= Distal promoter =

Regulatory DNA sequences

Distal promoter elements are regulatory DNA sequences that can be many kilobases distant from the gene that they regulate.

They can either be enhancers (increasing expression) or silencers (decreasing expression). They act by binding activator or repressor proteins (transcription factors) and the intervening DNA bends such that the bound proteins contact the core promoter and RNA polymerase.

== In T-cell development ==
T-cell development and activation is controlled by complementary placement of proximal and distal lck promoters. The generated environment of a Lck-PROX mice when approached with proximal promoter demonstrates maximal lck protein and normal thymic development, while distal promoters lead to deficient lck protein and unnormal thymic levels.

Further research at the late stage of thymocyte development reveals that distal Lck promoter with driven Cre will result in the distal lck gene promoter to drive Cre expression to be limited within innate-like T cells. There is a cell type specific function in innate-like T cells based on the distal lck promoter - driven Cre.

== In cancer ==
Multiple studies have discovered abnormalities in distal promoters within cancer cells. For example, an overactive distal promoter located about 1 kilobase away from the MUC5B gene contributes to atypical expression of this gene in gastric cancer cells. Similarly, a few polymorphisms in the RUNX3 distal promoter alter the promoter's function, increasing the activity of the NF-κB transcription factor and the expression of the IL1B gene. These polymorphisms have been correlated with increased vulnerability to intestinal gastric cancer.

Another cancer- related gene is EGLN2, which is located in the chromosome (19q13.2 region). This gene encodes an enzyme that can recognize conserved prolyl residues and hydroxylates it in a α-subunit of hypoxia inducible factor (HIF). The functional polymorphism is a 4bp insertion/deletion within the distal promoters, which can affect the expression of EGLN2.

== In RNA Polymerase II (RNAP2) ==
Distal promoters in RNA polymerase II bind at enhancer elements and may act as a marker for active regulatory sequences.
