= CpG site =

Region of often-methylated DNA with a cytosine followed by a guanine

a CpG site, i.e., the " 5'—C—phosphate—G—3' " sequence of nucleotides, is indicated on one DNA strand (in yellow). On the reverse DNA strand (in blue), the complementary 5'—CpG—3' site is shown. A C-G base-pairing between the two DNA strands is also indicated (right)

The CpG sites or CG sites are regions of DNA where a cytosine nucleotide is followed by a guanine nucleotide in the linear sequence of bases along its 5' → 3' direction. CpG sites occur with high frequency in genomic regions called CpG islands. CpGs are the common unit of methylation because their information is double stranded (the GpC complement is also methylated). This allows methylation information to be preserved during cell division.

Cytosines in CpG dinucleotides can be methylated to form 5-methylcytosines. Enzymes that add a methyl group are called DNA methyltransferases. In mammals, 70% to 80% of CpG cytosines are methylated. Methylating the cytosine within a gene can change its expression, a mechanism that is part of a larger field of science studying gene regulation that is called epigenetics. Methylated cytosines often mutate to thymines.

In humans, about 70% of promoters located near the transcription start site of a gene (proximal promoters) contain a CpG island.

== CpG characteristics ==
=== Definition ===
CpG is shorthand for 5'—C—phosphate—G—3' , that is, cytosine and guanine separated by only one phosphate group; phosphate links any two nucleosides together in DNA. The CpG notation is used to distinguish this single-stranded linear sequence from the CG base-pairing of cytosine and guanine for double-stranded sequences. The CpG notation is therefore to be interpreted as the cytosine being 5 prime to the guanine base. CpG should not be confused with GpC, the latter meaning that a guanine is followed by a cytosine in the 5' → 3' direction of a single-stranded sequence.

=== Under-representation caused by high mutation rate ===
CpG dinucleotides have long been observed to occur with a much lower frequency in the sequence of vertebrate genomes than would be expected due to random chance. For example, in the human genome, which has a 42% GC content, a pair of nucleotides consisting of cytosine followed by guanine would be expected to occur $0.21 \times 0.21 = 4.41 \%$ of the time. The frequency of CpG dinucleotides in human genomes is less than one-fifth of the expected frequency.

This underrepresentation is a consequence of the high mutation rate of methylated CpG sites: the spontaneously occurring deamination of a methylated cytosine results in a thymine, and the resulting G:T mismatched bases are often improperly resolved to A:T; whereas the deamination of unmethylated cytosine results in a uracil, which as a foreign base is quickly replaced by a cytosine by the base excision repair mechanism. The C to T transition rate at methylated CpG sites is ~10 fold higher than at unmethylated sites.

=== Genomic distribution ===
CpG sites	GpC sites
Distribution of CpG sites (left: in red) and GpC sites (right: in green) in the human APRT gene. CpG are more abundant in the upstream region of the gene, where they form a CpG island, whereas GpC are more evenly distributed. The 5 exons of the APRT gene are indicated (blue), and the start (ATG) and stop (TGA) codons are emphasized (bold blue).

CpG dinucleotides frequently occur in CpG islands (see definition of CpG islands, below). There are 28,890 CpG islands in the human genome, (50,267 if one includes CpG islands in repeat sequences). This is in agreement with the 28,519 CpG islands found by Venter et al. since the Venter et al. genome sequence did not include the interiors of highly similar repetitive elements and the extremely dense repeat regions near the centromeres. Since CpG islands contain multiple CpG dinucleotide sequences, there appear to be more than 20 million CpG dinucleotides in the human genome.

== CpG islands ==
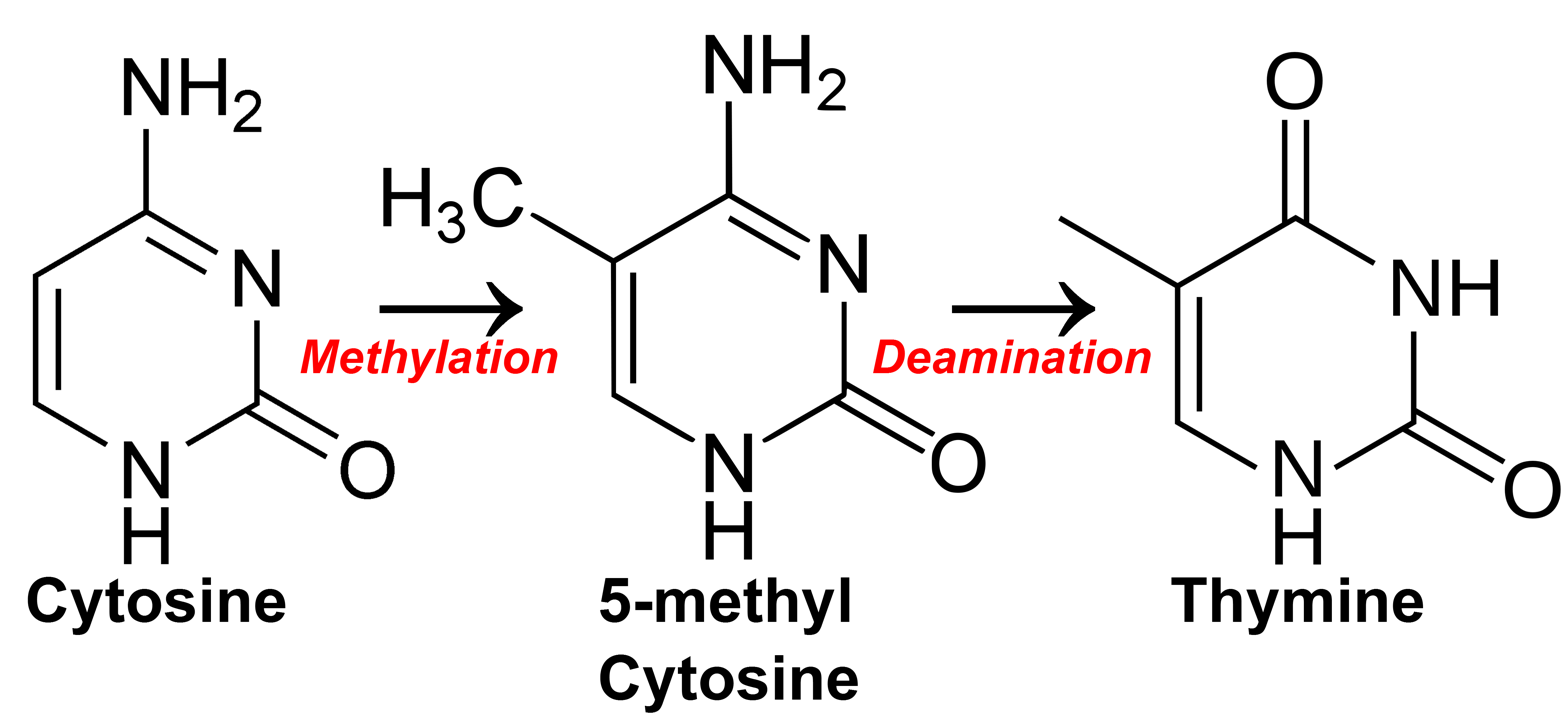
How methylation of CpG sites followed by spontaneous deamination leads to a lack of CpG sites in methylated DNA. As a result, residual CpG islands are created in areas where methylation is rare, and CpG sites stick (or where C to T mutation is highly detrimental).

CpG islands (or CG islands) are regions with a high frequency of CpG sites. Though objective definitions for CpG islands are limited, the usual formal definition is a region with at least 200 bp, a GC percentage greater than 50%, and an observed-to-expected CpG ratio greater than 60%. The "observed-to-expected CpG ratio" can be derived where the observed is calculated as: $(\text{number of }CpGs)$ and the expected as $(\text{number of }C * \text{number of }G) / \text{length of sequence}$ or $((\text{number of }C + \text{number of }G)/2)^2 / \text{length of sequence}$.

Many genes in mammalian genomes have CpG islands associated with the start of the gene (promoter regions). Because of this, the presence of a CpG island is used to help in the prediction and annotation of genes.

In mammalian genomes, CpG islands are typically 300–3,000 base pairs in length, and have been found in or near approximately 40% of promoters of mammalian genes. Over 60% of human genes and almost all house-keeping genes have their promoters embedded in CpG islands. Given the frequency of GC two-nucleotide sequences, the number of CpG dinucleotides is much lower than would be expected.

A 2002 study revised the rules of CpG island prediction to exclude other GC-rich genomic sequences such as Alu repeats. Based on an extensive search on the complete sequences of human chromosomes 21 and 22, DNA regions greater than 500 bp were found more likely to be the "true" CpG islands associated with the 5' regions of genes if they had a GC content greater than 55%, and an observed-to-expected CpG ratio of 65%.

CpG islands are characterized by CpG dinucleotide content of at least 60% of that which would be statistically expected (~4–6%), whereas the rest of the genome has much lower CpG frequency (~1%), a phenomenon called CG suppression. Unlike CpG sites in the coding region of a gene, in most instances the CpG sites in the CpG islands of promoters are unmethylated if the genes are expressed. This observation led to the speculation that methylation of CpG sites in the promoter of a gene may inhibit gene expression. Methylation, along with histone modification, is central to imprinting. Most of the methylation differences between tissues, or between normal and cancer samples, occur a short distance from the CpG islands (at "CpG island shores") rather than in the islands themselves.

CpG islands typically occur at or near the transcription start site of genes, particularly housekeeping genes, in vertebrates. A C (cytosine) base followed immediately by a G (guanine) base (a CpG) is rare in vertebrate DNA because the cytosines in such an arrangement tend to be methylated. This methylation helps distinguish the newly synthesized DNA strand from the parent strand, which aids in the final stages of DNA proofreading after duplication. However, over time methylated cytosines tend to turn into thymines because of spontaneous deamination. There is a special enzyme in humans (Thymine-DNA glycosylase, or TDG) that specifically replaces T's from T/G mismatches. However, due to the rarity of CpGs, it is theorised to be insufficiently effective in preventing a possibly rapid mutation of the dinucleotides. The existence of CpG islands is usually explained by the existence of selective forces for relatively high CpG content, or low levels of methylation in that genomic area, perhaps having to do with the regulation of gene expression. A 2011 study showed that most CpG islands are a result of non-selective forces.

== Methylation, silencing, cancer, and aging ==
An image showing a hypothetical evolutionary mechanism behind CpG island formation.

=== CpG islands in promoters ===
In humans, about 70% of promoters located near the transcription start site of a gene (proximal promoters) contain a CpG island.

Distal promoter elements also frequently contain CpG islands. An example is the DNA repair gene ERCC1, where the CpG island-containing element is located about 5,400 nucleotides upstream of the transcription start site of the ERCC1 gene. CpG islands also occur frequently in promoters for functional noncoding RNAs such as microRNAs.

=== Methylation of CpG islands stably silences genes ===
In humans, DNA methylation occurs at the 5 position of the pyrimidine ring of the cytosine residues within CpG sites to form 5-methylcytosines. The presence of multiple methylated CpG sites in CpG islands of promoters causes stable silencing of genes. Silencing of a gene may be initiated by other mechanisms, but this is often followed by methylation of CpG sites in the promoter CpG island to cause the stable silencing of the gene.

=== Promoter CpG hyper/hypo-methylation in cancer ===
In cancers, loss of expression of genes occurs about 10 times more frequently by hypermethylation of promoter CpG islands than by mutations. For example, in a colorectal cancer there are usually about 3 to 6 driver mutations and 33 to 66 hitchhiker or passenger mutations. In contrast, in one study of colon tumors compared to adjacent normal-appearing colonic mucosa, 1,734 CpG islands were heavily methylated in tumors whereas these CpG islands were not methylated in the adjacent mucosa. Half of the CpG islands were in promoters of annotated protein coding genes, suggesting that about 867 genes in a colon tumor have lost expression due to CpG island methylation. A separate study found an average of 1,549 differentially methylated regions (hypermethylated or hypomethylated) in the genomes of six colon cancers (compared to adjacent mucosa), of which 629 were in known promoter regions of genes. A third study found more than 2,000 genes differentially methylated between colon cancers and adjacent mucosa. Using gene set enrichment analysis, 569 out of 938 gene sets were hypermethylated and 369 were hypomethylated in cancers. Hypomethylation of CpG islands in promoters results in overexpression of the genes or gene sets affected.

One 2012 study listed 147 specific genes with colon cancer-associated hypermethylated promoters, along with the frequency with which these hypermethylations were found in colon cancers. At least 10 of those genes had hypermethylated promoters in nearly 100% of colon cancers. They also indicated 11 microRNAs whose promoters were hypermethylated in colon cancers at frequencies between 50% and 100% of cancers. MicroRNAs (miRNAs) are small endogenous RNAs that pair with sequences in messenger RNAs to direct post-transcriptional repression. On average, each microRNA represses several hundred target genes. Thus microRNAs with hypermethylated promoters may be allowing over-expression of hundreds to thousands of genes in a cancer.

The information above shows that, in cancers, promoter CpG hyper/hypo-methylation of genes and of microRNAs causes loss of expression (or sometimes increased expression) of far more genes than does mutation.

=== DNA repair genes with hyper/hypo-methylated promoters in cancers ===
DNA repair genes are frequently repressed in cancers due to hypermethylation of CpG islands within their promoters. In head and neck squamous cell carcinomas at least 15 DNA repair genes have frequently hypermethylated promoters; these genes are XRCC1, MLH3, PMS1, RAD51B, XRCC3, RAD54B, BRCA1, SHFM1, GEN1, FANCE, FAAP20, SPRTN, SETMAR, HUS1, and PER1. About seventeen types of cancer are frequently deficient in one or more DNA repair genes due to hypermethylation of their promoters. As an example, promoter hypermethylation of the DNA repair gene MGMT occurs in 93% of bladder cancers, 88% of stomach cancers, 74% of thyroid cancers, 40%-90% of colorectal cancers and 50% of brain cancers. Promoter hypermethylation of LIG4 occurs in 82% of colorectal cancers. Promoter hypermethylation of NEIL1 occurs in 62% of head and neck cancers and in 42% of non-small-cell lung cancers. Promoter hypermethylation of ATM occurs in 47% of non-small-cell lung cancers. Promoter hypermethylation of MLH1 occurs in 48% of non-small-cell lung cancer squamous cell carcinomas. Promoter hypermethylation of FANCB occurs in 46% of head and neck cancers.

On the other hand, the promoters of two genes, PARP1 and FEN1, were hypomethylated and these genes were over-expressed in numerous cancers. PARP1 and FEN1 are essential genes in the error-prone and mutagenic DNA repair pathway microhomology-mediated end joining. If this pathway is over-expressed the excess mutations it causes can lead to cancer. PARP1 is over-expressed in tyrosine kinase-activated leukemias, in neuroblastoma, in testicular and other germ cell tumors, and in Ewing's sarcoma, FEN1 is over-expressed in the majority of cancers of the breast, prostate, stomach, neuroblastomas, pancreatic, and lung.

DNA damage appears to be the primary underlying cause of cancer. If accurate DNA repair is deficient, DNA damages tend to accumulate. Such excess DNA damage can increase mutational errors during DNA replication due to error-prone translesion synthesis. Excess DNA damage can also increase epigenetic alterations due to errors during DNA repair. Such mutations and epigenetic alterations can give rise to cancer (see malignant neoplasms). Thus, CpG island hyper/hypo-methylation in the promoters of DNA repair genes are likely central to progression to cancer.

=== Methylation of CpG sites with age ===
Since age has a strong effect on DNA methylation levels on tens of thousands of CpG sites, one can define a highly accurate biological clock (referred to as epigenetic clock or DNA methylation age) in humans and chimpanzees.

=== Unmethylated sites ===
Unmethylated CpG dinucleotide sites can be detected by Toll-like receptor 9 (TLR 9) on plasmacytoid dendritic cells, monocytes, natural killer (NK) cells, and B cells in humans. This is used to detect intracellular viral infection.

== Role of CpG sites in memory ==
In mammals, DNA methyltransferases (which add methyl groups to DNA bases) exhibit a sequence preference for cytosines within CpG sites. In the mouse brain, 4.2% of all cytosines are methylated, primarily in the context of CpG sites, forming 5mCpG. Most hypermethylated 5mCpG sites increase the repression of associated genes.

As reviewed by Duke et al., neuron DNA methylation (repressing expression of particular genes) is altered by neuronal activity. Neuron DNA methylation is required for synaptic plasticity; is modified by experiences; and active DNA methylation and demethylation is required for memory formation and maintenance.

In 2016 Halder et al. using mice, and in 2017 Duke et al. using rats, subjected the rodents to contextual fear conditioning, causing an especially strong long-term memory to form. At 24 hours after the conditioning, in the hippocampus brain region of rats, the expression of 1,048 genes was down-regulated (usually associated with 5mCpG in gene promoters) and the expression of 564 genes was up-regulated (often associated with hypomethylation of CpG sites in gene promoters). At 24 hours after training, 9.2% of the genes in the rat genome of hippocampus neurons were differentially methylated. However while the hippocampus is essential for learning new information it does not store information itself. In the mouse experiments of Halder, 1,206 differentially methylated genes were seen in the hippocampus one hour after contextual fear conditioning but these altered methylations were reversed and not seen after four weeks. In contrast with the absence of long-term CpG methylation changes in the hippocampus, substantial differential CpG methylation could be detected in cortical neurons during memory maintenance. There were 1,223 differentially methylated genes in the anterior cingulate cortex of mice four weeks after contextual fear conditioning.

=== Demethylation at CpG sites requires ROS activity ===
Initiation of DNA demethylation at a CpG site.

In adult somatic cells DNA methylation typically occurs in the context of CpG dinucleotides (CpG sites), forming 5-methylcytosine-pG, or 5mCpG. Reactive oxygen species (ROS) may attack guanine at the dinucleotide site, forming 8-hydroxy-2'-deoxyguanosine (8-OHdG), and resulting in a 5mCp-8-OHdG dinucleotide site. The base excision repair enzyme OGG1 targets 8-OHdG and binds to the lesion without immediate excision. OGG1, present at a 5mCp-8-OHdG site recruits TET1 and TET1 oxidizes the 5mC adjacent to the 8-OHdG. This initiates demethylation of 5mC.

Demethylation of 5-Methylcytosine (5mC) in neuron DNA.

As reviewed in 2018, in brain neurons, 5mC is oxidized by the ten-eleven translocation (TET) family of dioxygenases (TET1, TET2, TET3) to generate 5-hydroxymethylcytosine (5hmC). In successive steps TET enzymes further hydroxylate 5hmC to generate 5-formylcytosine (5fC) and 5-carboxylcytosine (5caC). Thymine-DNA glycosylase (TDG) recognizes the intermediate bases 5fC and 5caC and excises the glycosidic bond resulting in an apyrimidinic site (AP site). In an alternative oxidative deamination pathway, 5hmC can be oxidatively deaminated by activity-induced cytidine deaminase/apolipoprotein B mRNA editing complex (AID/APOBEC) deaminases to form 5-hydroxymethyluracil (5hmU) or 5mC can be converted to thymine (Thy). 5hmU can be cleaved by TDG, single-strand-selective monofunctional uracil-DNA glycosylase 1 (SMUG1), Nei-Like DNA Glycosylase 1 (NEIL1), or methyl-CpG binding protein 4 (MBD4). AP sites and T:G mismatches are then repaired by base excision repair (BER) enzymes to yield cytosine (Cyt).

Two reviews summarize the large body of evidence for the critical and essential role of ROS in memory formation. The DNA demethylation of thousands of CpG sites during memory formation depends on initiation by ROS. In 2016, Zhou et al., showed that ROS have a central role in DNA demethylation.

TET1 is a key enzyme involved in demethylating 5mCpG. However, TET1 is only able to act on 5mCpG if an ROS has first acted on the guanine to form 8-hydroxy-2'-deoxyguanosine (8-OHdG), resulting in a 5mCp-8-OHdG dinucleotide (see first figure in this section). After formation of 5mCp-8-OHdG, the base excision repair enzyme OGG1 binds to the 8-OHdG lesion without immediate excision. Adherence of OGG1 to the 5mCp-8-OHdG site recruits TET1, allowing TET1 to oxidize the 5mC adjacent to 8-OHdG, as shown in the first figure in this section. This initiates the demethylation pathway shown in the second figure in this section.

Altered protein expression in neurons, controlled by ROS-dependent demethylation of CpG sites in gene promoters within neuron DNA, is central to memory formation.

== CpG loss ==
CpG depletion has been observed in the process of DNA methylation of Transposable Elements (TEs) where TEs are not only responsible in the genome expansion but also CpG loss in a host DNA. TEs can be known as "methylation centers" whereby the methylation process, the TEs spreads into the flanking DNA once in the host DNA. This spreading might subsequently result in CpG loss over evolutionary time. Older evolutionary times show a higher CpG loss in the flanking DNA, compared to the younger evolutionary times. Therefore, the DNA methylation can lead eventually to the noticeably loss of CpG sites in neighboring DNA.

=== Genome size and CpG ratio are negatively correlated ===
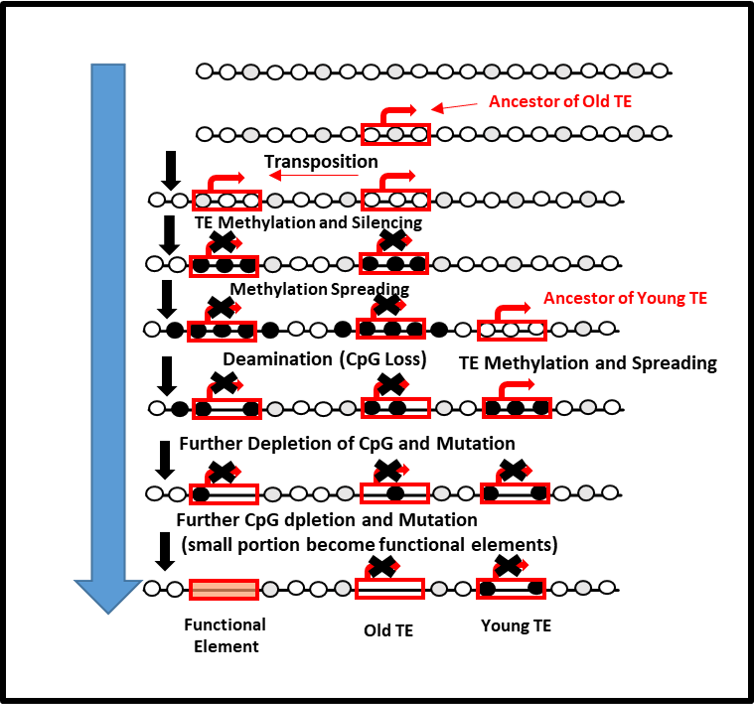
CpG methylation contributes to the genome expansion and consequently to CpG depletion. This picture shows a genome with no TEs and unmethylated CpG sites, and the insertion and transposition of a TE lead to methylation and silencing of the TE. Through the process of CpG methylation a decrease in CpG is found.

There is generally an inverse correlation between genome size and number of CpG islands, as larger genomes typically have a greater number of transposable elements. Selective pressure against TE's is substantially reduced if expression is suppressed via methylation, further TE's can act as "methylation centres" facilitating methylation of flanking DNA. Since methylation reduces selective pressure on nucleotide sequence long term methylation of CpG sites increases accumulation of spontaneous cytosine to thymine transitions, thereby resulting in a loss of Cp sites.

==== Alu elements as promoters of CpG loss ====
Alu elements are known as the most abundant type of transposable elements. Some studies have used Alu elements as a way to study the factors responsible for genome expansion. Alu elements are CpG-rich in a longer amount of sequence, unlike LINEs and ERVs. Alus can work as a methylation center, and the insertion into a host DNA can produce DNA methylation and provoke a spreading into the Flanking DNA area. This spreading is why there is considerable CpG loss and genome expansion. However, this is a result that is analyzed over time because older Alu elements show more CpG loss in sites of neighboring DNA compared to younger ones.

== See also ==
- TLR9, detector of unmethylated CpG sites
- DNA methylation age
