= Differentially methylated region =

Genomic region methylated differently based on tissue, time or individual

Differentially methylated regions (DMRs) are genomic regions with different DNA methylation status across different biological samples and regarded as possible functional regions involved in gene transcriptional regulation. The biological samples can be different cells/tissues within the same individual, the same cell/tissue at different times, cells/tissues from different individuals, even different alleles in the same cell.

DNA is mostly methylated at a CpG site, which is a cytosine followed by a guanine. The “p” refers to the phosphate linker between them. DMR usually involves adjacent sites or a group of sites close together that have different methylation patterns between samples. CpG islands appear to be unmethylated in most of the normal tissues, however, are highly methylated in cancer tissues.

There are several different types of DMRs. These include tissue-specific DMR (tDMR), cancer-specific DMR (cDMR), development stages (dDMRs), reprogramming-specific DMR (rDMR), allele-specific DMR (AMR), and aging-specific DMR (aDMR). DNA methylation is associated with cell differentiation and proliferation.
