= Tet methylcytosine dioxygenase 1 =

Mammalian protein found in Homo sapiens

TET1

Identifiers
- Aliases: TET1, CXXC6, LCX, bA119F7.1, MLL-TET1-MLL, Tet methylcytosine dioxygenase 1
- External IDs: OMIM: 607790; MGI: 1098693; GeneCards: TET1
Enzyme activity
EC #	BRENDA	ExPASy	KEGG	MetaCyc
1.14.11.80	↗	↗	↗	↗

Gene location (Human)
Chr.	Chromosome 10 (human)
Band	10q21.3	Start	68,560,337 bp
Band	10q21.3	End	68,694,487 bp

Gene location (Mouse)
Chr.	Chromosome 10 (mouse)
Band	10 B4|10 32.48 cM	Start	62,640,349 bp
Band	10 B4|10 32.48 cM	End	62,744,775 bp
RNA expression pattern
Bgee	Human / Mouse (ortholog); Top expressed in: gonad; ventricular zone; Achilles tendon; ganglionic eminence; pancreatic ductal cell; tibialis anterior muscle; testicle; retinal pigment epithelium; deltoid muscle; sural nerve / Top expressed in: trophoblast giant cell; Rostral migratory stream; tail of embryo; genital tubercle; blastocyst; ejaculatory duct; morula; primitive streak; embryo; atrioventricular valve; More reference expression data
BioGPS	n/a
Gene ontology
Molecular function	iron ion binding; zinc ion binding; methylcytosine dioxygenase activity; dioxygenase activity; metal ion binding; oxidoreductase activity; DNA binding; DNA-binding transcription factor activity, RNA polymerase II-specific
Cellular component	nucleus
Biological process	regulation of transcription, DNA-templated; positive regulation of histone methylation; protein O-linked glycosylation; negative regulation of DNA methylation-dependent heterochromatin assembly; transcription, DNA-templated; stem cell population maintenance; inner cell mass cell differentiation; positive regulation of cell population proliferation; DNA demethylation; positive regulation of transcription by RNA polymerase II; chromatin organization; 5-methylcytosine catabolic process; oxidative demethylation
Sources:Amigo / QuickGO
Orthologs
Databases	NCBI: entry; OMA: entry
Species	Human	Mouse
Entrez	80312	52463
Ensembl	ENSG00000138336	ENSMUSG00000047146
UniProt	Q8NFU7	Q3URK3
RefSeq (mRNA)	NM_030625	NM_001253857; NM_027384
RefSeq (protein)	NP_085128	NP_001240786; NP_001393310; NP_001393311; NP_001393312
Location (UCSC)	Chr 10: 68.56 – 68.69 Mb	Chr 10: 62.64 – 62.74 Mb
PubMed search
- Wikidata
View/Edit Human	View/Edit Mouse

Ten-eleven translocation methylcytosine dioxygenase 1 (TET1) is a member of the TET family of enzymes, in humans it is encoded by the TET1 gene. Its function, regulation, and utilizable pathways remain a matter of current research while it seems to be involved in DNA demethylation and therefore gene regulation, but is expressed as different isoforms which may have distinct functions.

== Discovery ==
TET1 was first discovered in a 61-year-old patient with a rare variation of t(10;11)(q22;q23) acute myeloid leukemia (AML) as a zinc-finger binding protein (specifically on the CXXC domain) that fuses to the gene MLL. Another study confirmed that this protein was a translocation partner of MLL in an 8-year-old patient with t(10;11)(q22;q23) AML and named the protein Ten-Eleven Translocation 1.

== Function ==
TET1 catalyzes the conversion of the modified DNA base 5-methylcytosine (5-mC) to 5-hydroxymethylcytosine (5-hmC).

TET1 produces 5-hmC by oxidation of 5-mC in an iron and alpha-ketoglutarate dependent manner. The conversion of 5-mC to 5-hmC has been proposed as the initial step of active DNA demethylation in mammals. Additionally, downgrading TET1 has decreased levels of 5-formylcytosine (5-fC) and 5-carboxylcytosine (5-caC) in both cell cultures and mice.

A site with a 5-hmC base already has increased transcriptional activity, a state termed "functional demethylation". This state is common in post-mitotic neurons. However it has also been found to inhibit transcription of some genes, and is associated with various transcriptional repressors, especially PRC2 complex, suggesting diverse modes of action.

TET1 may play a role in memory extinction(1). TET1-knockout mice show markedly impaired memory extinction, despite maintaining normal memory acquisition.

== Applications ==
TET1 appears to facilitate nuclear reprogramming of somatic cells to iPS cells.

The enzyme is also utilized as part of TET-Assisted Bisulfite Sequencing (TAB-seq) to quantify levels of hydroxymethylation in the genome and to distinguish 5-hydroxymethylcytosine (5hmc) from 5-methylcytosine (5mc) at single base resolution. The technique was developed by Chuan He and rectifies the inability of traditional bisulfite sequencing to decipher between the two modified bases. In this technique, TET1 is responsible for the oxidation of 5mc allowing it to be read as thymine following treatment with bisulfite. This is not the case for 5hmc as it is glucosylated in the initial step inhibiting its oxidation by TET1.

== Clinical significance ==
Patients with schizophrenia or bipolar disorder have shown increased levels of TET1 mRNA and protein expression in the inferior parietal lobule, indicating these diseases may be caused by mistakes in gene expression regulation.

Colon, breast, prostate and liver tumors have significantly reduced levels of TET1 compared to the healthy colon cells and normal epithelial colon cells with downgraded TET1 levels have greater levels of proliferation. Additionally, increasing TET1 expression levels in colon cancer cells decreased cell proliferation in both cell cultures and mice through demethylation of promoters of the WNT signaling pathway.

Breast cancer cell lines with silenced TET1 expression have increased rates of invasion and breast cancers that spread to the lymph nodes are characterized by lower TET1 levels. TET1 levels could be used to detect breast cancer metastasis. A histone deacetylase inhibitor Trichostatin A increased levels of TET1 in breast cancer tissues but was a less effective tumor suppressor in patients with low TET1 expression. Breast cancer patients with high TET1 levels had significantly higher survival probabilities than patients with low TET1 levels.

Degradation of TET1 in hypoxia-induced EMT lung cancer cells led to reduced metastasis rates and cells. Healthy cells transitioning to cancer cells have decreased levels of TET1 but decreasing TET1 expression does not lead to malignancy. Cancer cells using the KRAS pathway had decreased invasive potential after reintroducing TET1, likewise downgrading KRAS increased TET1 levels.
