= TET-assisted pyridine borane sequencing =

Laboratory technique for DNA methylation profiling

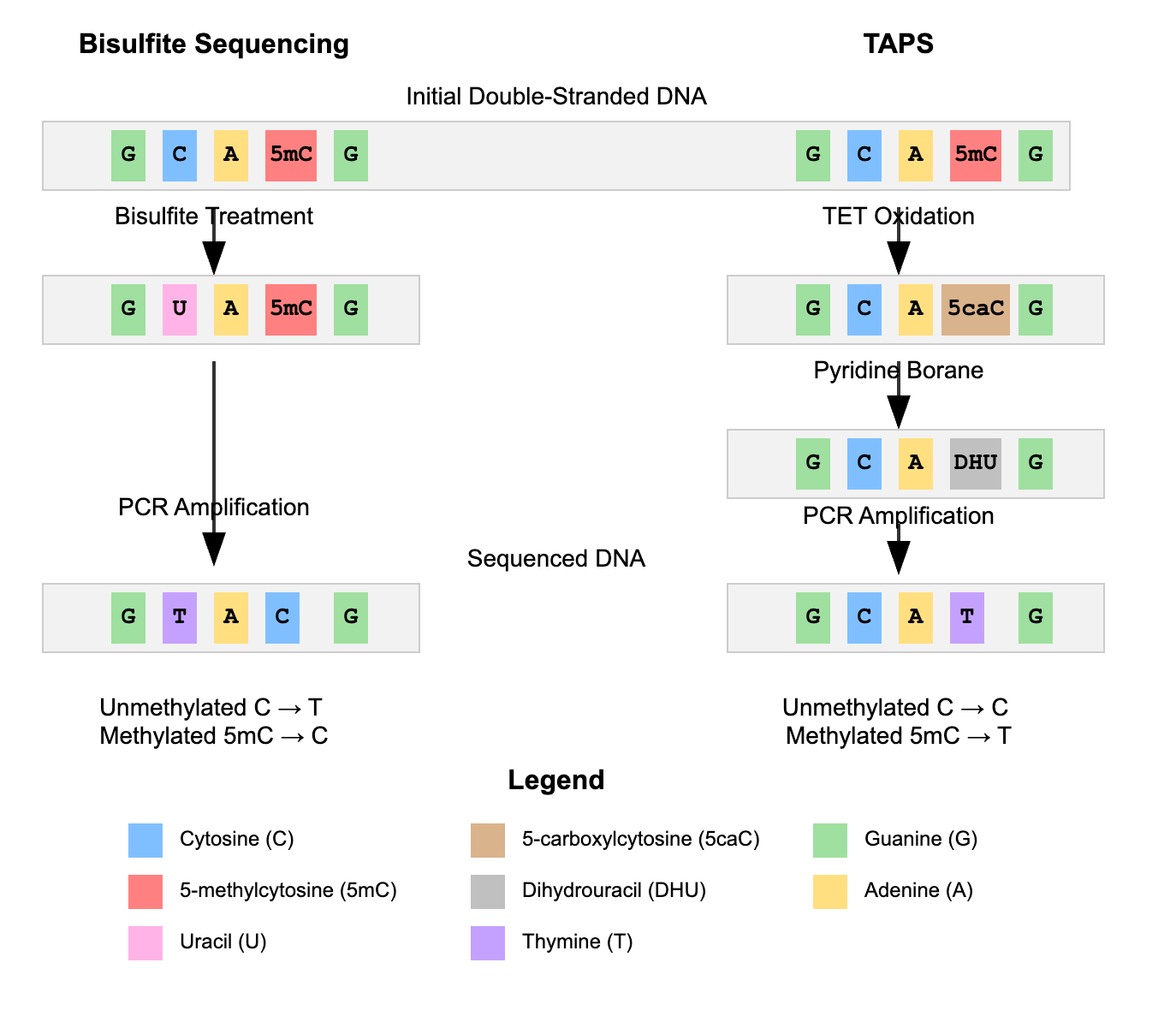
TAPS vs Bisulfite sequencing for DNA methylation

TET-assisted pyridine borane sequencing or TAPS is a laboratory technique in epigenetics for high-throughput profiling of DNA methylation at a single base-pair resolution. It uses a two-step enzymatic conversion of methylated cytosines, 5mC and 5hmC, to uracil which is read as a thymine after sequencing. Due to direct conversion of methylated bases, TAPS is a mC-to-T chemistry unlike traditional method such as bisulfite sequencing or EM-Seq which are C-to-T chemistries and convert unmethylated cytosines. The enzymatic conversion mitigates DNA damage and degradation and direct conversion improves the sensitivity and specificity of DNA methylation profiling.

== History ==
TAPS was developed by Chunxiao Song and Benjamin Schuster-Böckler and their groups affiliated with Ludwig Cancer Research at the University of Oxford in 2019 and published in Nature Biotechnology. TAPS is patented in US and its technology is licensed to Exact Sciences Corporation and its exclusive partner Watchmaker Genomics.

== Mechanism ==
Unlike bisulfite sequencing, which converts unmodified cytosine (C) to uracil (U) (read as thymine, T, after PCR) while leaving 5mC and 5hmC largely unchanged (read as C), TAPS uses a different chemical approach. It employs Ten-eleven translocation (TET) enzymes to oxidize both 5mC and 5hmC to 5-carboxylcytosine (5caC). Subsequently, pyridine borane selectively reduces 5caC to dihydrouracil (DHU), which, like uracil, is read as thymine (T) during PCR amplification. Critically, unmodified cytosine (C) remains unaffected by this process and is read as C. Therefore, the TAPS readout is C → C, while 5mC → T and 5hmC → T.

The TAPS method involves two main chemical steps followed by PCR amplification and sequencing:

- TET oxidation: Double-stranded DNA is incubated with a TET dioxygenase (commonly mammalian TET2) and necessary cofactors (including α-ketoglutarate and Fe(II)). TET enzymes catalyze the iterative oxidation of the methyl group of 5mC and the hydroxymethyl group of 5hmC, ultimately converting both bases into 5-carboxylcytosine (5caC). Unmodified cytosine (C) is not a substrate for TET enzymes under standard TAPS conditions.
- Pyridine borane reduction: The TET-treated DNA is then treated with pyridine borane $({\text{BH}}_{3}{\cdot}{\text{C}}_{5}{\text{H}}_{5}{\text{N}})$. This reducing agent selectively converts the carboxyl group of 5caC (and also the formyl group of 5-formylcytosine, 5fC, if present) into a hydrogen, via intermediates, eventually yielding dihydrouracil (DHU). Pyridine borane does not reduce unmodified cytosine, 5mC, or 5hmC under the reaction conditions used.

During subsequent PCR amplification, DNA polymerase reads DHU as if it were thymine (T). Unmodified cytosine bases, which were unaffected by the TAPS chemistry, are read as cytosine (C). Therefore, sites originally containing 5mC or 5hmC appear as T in the final sequencing reads, while original C bases appear as C. The resulting sequencing data can then be aligned to a reference genome, and the methylation status (presence of 5mC or 5hmC) at each cytosine position can be inferred by comparing the sequenced reads to the reference. A C-to-T conversion at a cytosine site indicates the original presence of either 5mC or 5hmC.

== Significance ==
TAPS directly converts methylated cytosines into uracils without affecting unmodified cytosines. This results in improved sensitivity and specificity of DNA methylation profiling. Further, unlike bisulfite treatment, it offers similar advantages to EM-Seq through enzymatic conversion process. However, the default TAPS protocol cannot distinguish between 5mC and 5hmC.

== Variations ==
=== TAPSβ ===
Standard TAPS detects both 5mC and 5hmC as T, and cannot distinguish between them. To specifically map 5hmC, a variation called TAPSβ (TAPS-beta) was developed. TAPSβ incorporates an initial enzymatic step before the TET oxidation which protects the 5hmC by binding a glucose moiety to the hydroxyl group of 5hmC through a β-Glucosyl transferase enzyme, forming 5-glucosylated hydroxymethylcytosine (5ghmC). The standard TAPS procedure (TET oxidation followed by pyridine borane reduction) is then performed. The bulky glucose group on 5ghmC effectively blocks the TET enzyme from oxidizing it to 5caC. Therefore, 5hmC bases protected by glucosylation are not converted to DHU/T.

=== Chemical-Assisted Pyridine borane Sequencing (CAPS) ===
CAPS protocol, developed with TAPSβ, allows direct detection of the oxidized methylcytosine derivatives 5-formylcytosine (5fC) and 5-carboxylcytosine (5caC). CAPS uses pyridine borane reduction directly on genomic DNA without the initial TET oxidation step. Pyridine borane reduces 5fC and 5caC to DHU (read as T), while unmodified C, 5mC, and 5hmC are unaffected (read as C). This allows for the specific mapping of 5fC and 5caC.

== See also ==
- DNA methylation
- 5-methylcytosine (5mC)
- 5-hydroxymethylcytosine (5hmC)
- Epigenetics
- Bisulfite sequencing
