= Tet methylcytosine dioxygenase 2 =

Human gene

TET2
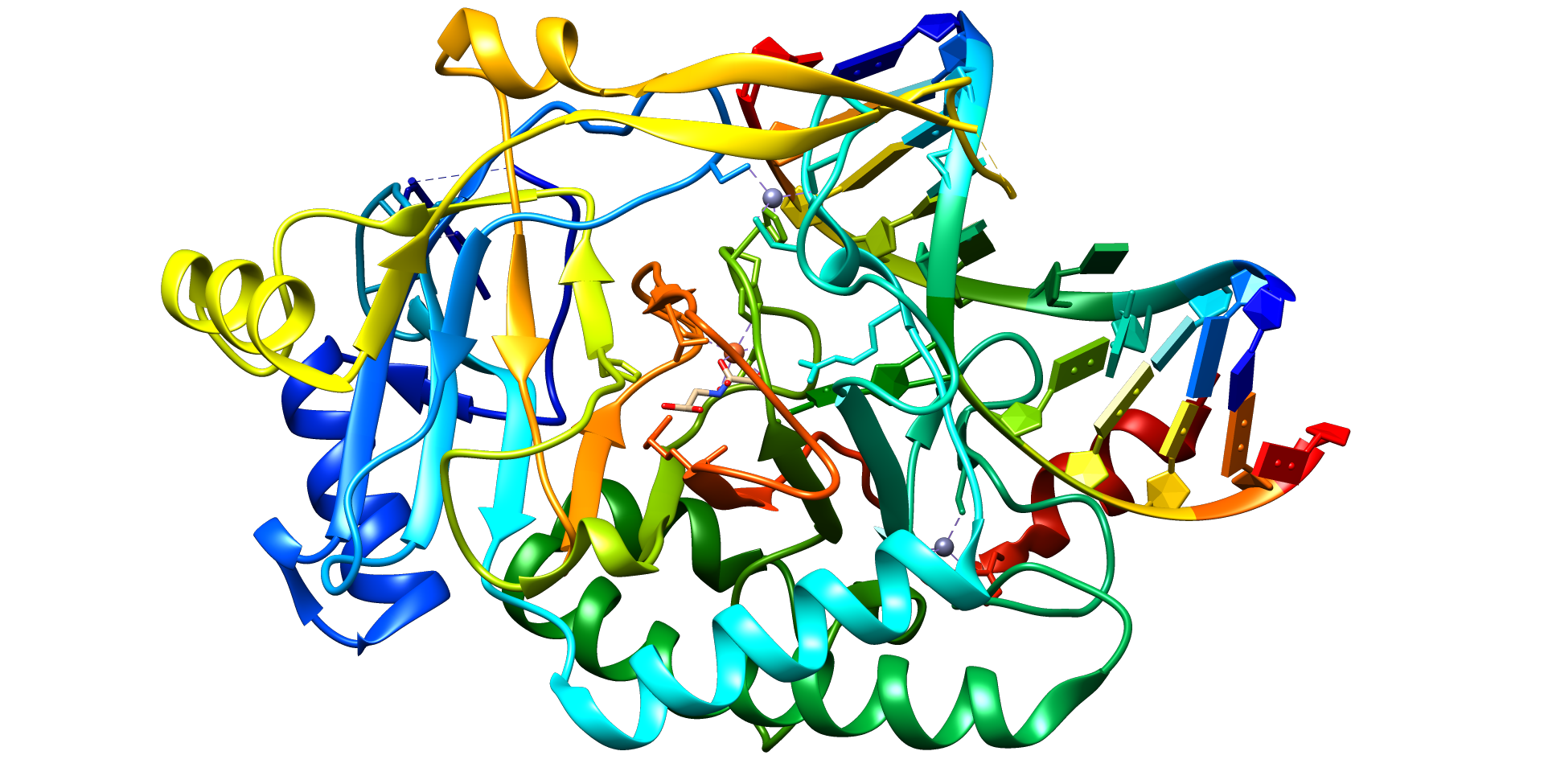

Identifiers
- Aliases: TET2, KIAA1546, MDS, tet methylcytosine dioxygenase 2, Tet methylcytosine dioxygenase 2, IMD75
- External IDs: OMIM: 612839; MGI: 2443298; GeneCards: TET2
Available structures
PDB	Ortholog search: PDBe RCSB
PDB	List of PDB id codes 4NM6, 5DEU, 5D9Y
Enzyme activity
EC #	BRENDA	ExPASy	KEGG	MetaCyc
1.14.11.80	↗	↗	↗	↗

Gene location (Human)
Chr.	Chromosome 4 (human)
Band	4q24	Start	105,145,875 bp
Band	4q24	End	105,279,816 bp

Gene location (Mouse)
Chr.	Chromosome 3 (mouse)
Band	3|3 G3	Start	133,169,440 bp
Band	3|3 G3	End	133,250,900 bp
RNA expression pattern
Bgee	Human / Mouse (ortholog); Top expressed in: palpebral conjunctiva; amniotic fluid; epithelium of nasopharynx; germinal epithelium; bone marrow cell; gingival epithelium; mucosa of ileum; nasal epithelium; monocyte; visceral pleura / Top expressed in: urethra; Rostral migratory stream; trophoblast giant cell; pineal gland; hand; vas deferens; neural layer of retina; otolith organ; utricle; submandibular gland; More reference expression data
BioGPS	n/a
Gene ontology
Molecular function	protein binding; metal ion binding; oxidoreductase activity; dioxygenase activity; zinc ion binding; DNA binding; ferrous iron binding; methylcytosine dioxygenase activity; iron ion binding
Cellular component	nucleus
Biological process	5-methylcytosine catabolic process; cell cycle; response to organic cyclic compound; protein O-linked glycosylation; myeloid cell differentiation; positive regulation of transcription by RNA polymerase II; DNA demethylation; histone H3-K4 trimethylation; chromatin organization; oxidative demethylation
Sources:Amigo / QuickGO
Orthologs
Databases	NCBI: entry; OMA: entry
Species	Human	Mouse
Entrez	54790	214133
Ensembl	ENSG00000168769	ENSMUSG00000040943
UniProt	Q6N021	Q4JK59
RefSeq (mRNA)	NM_001127208; NM_017628	NM_001040400; NM_145989; NM_001346736
RefSeq (protein)	NP_001120680; NP_060098	NP_001035490; NP_001333665
Location (UCSC)	Chr 4: 105.15 – 105.28 Mb	Chr 3: 133.17 – 133.25 Mb
PubMed search
- Wikidata
View/Edit Human	View/Edit Mouse

Tet methylcytosine dioxygenase 2 (TET2) is a human gene. It resides at chromosome 4q24, in a region showing recurrent microdeletions and copy-neutral loss of heterozygosity (CN-LOH) in patients with diverse myeloid malignancies.

== Function ==
TET2 encodes a protein that catalyzes the conversion of the modified DNA base methylcytosine to 5-hydroxymethylcytosine.

The first mechanistic reports showed tissue-specific accumulation of 5-hydroxymethylcytosine (5hmC) and the conversion of 5mC to 5hmC by TET1 in humans in 2009. In these two papers, Kriaucionis and Heintz provided evidence that a high abundance of 5hmC can be found in specific tissues and Tahiliani et al. demonstrated the TET1-dependent conversion of 5mC to 5hmC. A role for TET1 in cancer was reported in 2003 showing that it acted as a complex with MLL (myeloid/lymphoid or mixed-lineage leukaemia 1) (KMT2A), a positive global regulator of gene transcription that is named after its role cancer regulation. An explanation for protein function was provided in 2009 via computational search for enzymes that could modify 5mC. At this time, methylation was known to be crucial for gene silencing, mammalian development, and retrotransposon silencing. The mammalian TET proteins were found to be orthologues of Trypanosoma brucei base J-binding protein 1 (JBP1) and JBP2. Base J was the first hypermodified base that was known in eukaryotic DNA and had been found in T. brucei DNA in the early 1990s, although the evidence of an unusual form of DNA modification goes back to at least the mid 1980s.

In two articles published back-to-back in Science journal in 2011, firstly it was demonstrated that (1) TET converts 5mC to 5fC and 5caC, and (2) 5fC and 5caC are both present in mouse embryonic stem cells and organs, and secondly that (1) TET converts 5mC and 5hmC to 5caC, (2) the 5caC can then be excised by thymine DNA glycosylase (TDG), and (3) depleting TDG causes 5caC accumulation in mouse embryonic stem cells.

In general terms, DNA methylation causes specific sequences to become inaccessible for gene expression. The process of demethylation is initiated through modification of the 5mC to 5hmC, 5fC, etc. To return to the unmodified form of cytosine (C), the site is targeted for TDG-dependent base excision repair (TET–TDG–BER). The “thymine” in TDG (thymine DNA glycosylase) might be considered a misnomer; TDG was previously known for removing thymine moieties from G/T mismatches.

The process involves hydrolysing the carbon-nitrogen bond between the sugar-phosphate DNA backbone and the mismatched thymine. Only in 2011, two publications demonstrated the activity for TDG as also excising the oxidation products of 5-methylcytosine. Furthermore, in the same year it was shown that TDG excises both 5fC and 5caC. The site left behind remains abasic until it is repaired by the base excision repair system. The biochemical process was further described in 2016 by evidence of base excision repair coupled with TET and TDG.

In simple terms, TET–TDG–BER produces demethylation; TET proteins oxidise 5mC to create the substrate for TDG-dependent excision. Base excision repair then replaces 5mC with C.

== Clinical significance ==
The most striking outcome of aberrant TET activity is its association with the development of cancer.

Mutations in this gene were first identified in myeloid neoplasms with deletion or uniparental disomy at 4q24. TET2 may also be a candidate for active DNA demethylation, the catalytic removal of the methyl group added to the fifth carbon on the cytosine base.

Damaging variants in TET2 were attributed as the cause of several myeloid malignancies around the same time as the protein’s function was reported for TET-dependent oxidation. Not only were damaging TET2 mutations found in disease, but the levels of 5hmC were also affected, linking the molecular mechanism of impaired demethylation with disease [75]. In mice the depletion of TET2 skewed the differentiation of haematopoietic precursors, as well as amplifying the rate of haematopoietic or progenitor cell renewal. It has also been reported that 5mC oxidation by TET2 of RNA rather than DNA affects chromatin towards an open state.

Somatic TET2 mutations are frequently observed in myelodysplastic syndromes (MDS), myeloproliferative neoplasms (MPN), MDS/MPN overlap syndromes including chronic myelomonocytic leukaemia (CMML), acute myeloid leukaemias (AML) and secondary AML (sAML).

TET2 mutations have prognostic value in cytogenetically normal acute myeloid leukemia (CN-AML). "Nonsense" and "frameshift" mutations in this gene are associated with poor outcome on standard therapies in this otherwise favorable-risk patient subset.

Loss-of-function TET2 mutations may also have a possible causal role in atherogenesis as reported by Jaiswal S. et al, as a consequence of clonal hematopoiesis. Loss-of-function due to somatic variants are frequently reported in cancer, however homozygous germline loss-of-function has been shown in humans, causing childhood immunodeficiency and lymphoma. The phenotype of immunodeficiency, autoimmunity and lymphoproliferation highlights requisite roles of TET2 in the human immune system.

== WIT pathway ==
TET2 is mutated in 7%–23% of acute myeloid leukemia (AML) patients. Importantly, TET2 is mutated in a mutually exclusive manner with WT1, IDH1, and IDH2. TET2 can be recruited by WT1, a sequence-specific zinc finger transcription factor, to WT1-target genes, which it then activates by converting methylcytosine into 5-hydroxymethylcytosine at the genes’ promoters. Additionally, isocitrate dehydrogenases 1 and 2, encoded by IDH1 and IDH2, respectively, can inhibit the activity of TET proteins when present in mutant forms that produce the TET inhibitor D-2-hydroxyglutarate. Together, WT1, IDH1/2 and TET2 define the WIT pathway in AML. The WIT pathway might also be more broadly involved in suppressing tumor formation, as a number of non-hematopoietic malignancies appear to harbor mutations of WIT genes in a non-exclusive manner.
