= 5-base sequencing =

DNA sequencing method

5-base sequencing refers to the detection of five nucleotide bases in DNA, including the four standard bases (adenine, guanine, cytosine, and thymine) and a modified base, 5-methylcytosine (5mC), an important epigenetic marker. In a typical DNA sequencing experiment, the epigenetic modification is lost during the PCR amplification step and only the base forms of nucleotides are recognized. In a 5-base sequencing based experiment, the information about methylation of cytosines is preserved through chemical or enzymatic modification allowing inference of methylation status during bioinformatics analysis. More recently, nanopore or single-molecule realtime sequencing have enabled direct detection of methylated cytosines without any conversion of the DNA. In October 2025, Illumina announced a proprietary 5-base sequencing solution using an engineered DNA for 5mC detection on top of standard bases.

The approach can further be extended to detect 5hmC modification, known as 6-base genome or sequencing.

== See also ==
- Epigenetics
- DNA methylation
- Enzymatic methyl-seq
