= Enzymatic methyl-seq =

Method for analyzing DNA methylation using enzymes

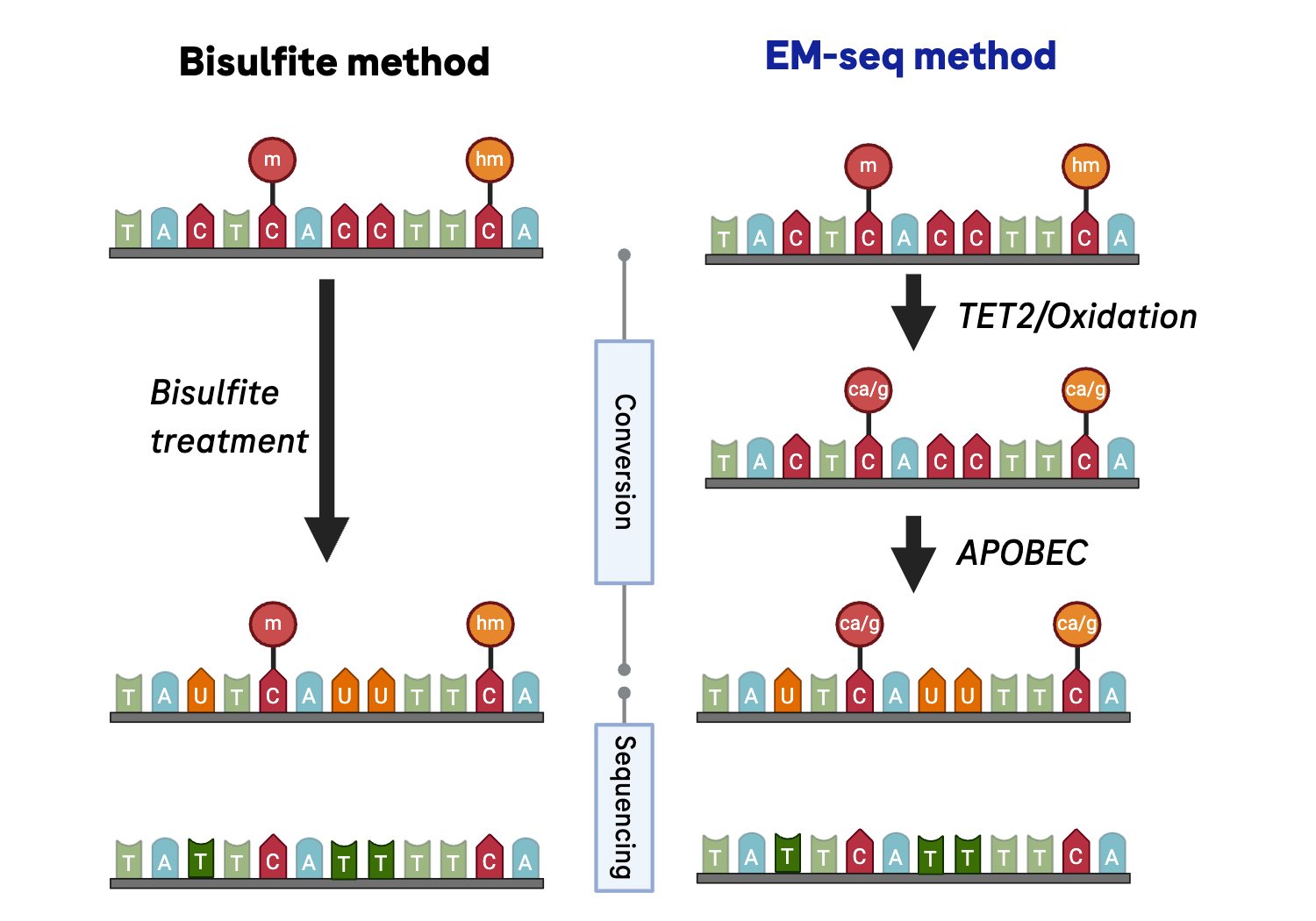
Schematic of Enzymatic methyl-seq conversion compared with Sodium bisulfite method.

Enzymatic methyl-seq or EM-Seq is a laboratory technique for high-throughput profiling of DNA methylation at a single-nucleotide resolution across the genome. EM-Seq is a C-to-T chemistry where non-methylated cytosines (C) are converted into uracil (U) through enzymatic conversion before sequencing and read as thymine (T). This enzymatic conversion of cytosine to uracil is achieved through two sets of enzymatic reactions using three enzymes TET2, T4-BGT and APOBEC3A. The method primarily detects 5-methylcytosine (5mC), the most common form of DNA methylation in mammals, but can also detect 5-hydroxymethylcytosine (5hmC) as both are protected from deamination in the standard protocol.

Enzymatic conversion has reduced DNA damage and loss than bisulfite-treated libraries generally leading to higher quality sequencing libraries characterized by greater complexity and yield, often achievable from smaller quantities of input DNA.

== History ==
EM-seq was developed by researchers from New England Biolabs as an alternative to whole genome bisulfite sequencing (WGBS) and related bisulfite-based methods. Milder enzymatic reaction conditions were intended to improve the quality and yield of sequencing libraries, especially when working with limited or degraded DNA samples, compared to harsh chemical treatment of bisulfite causing significant DNA fragmentation and degradation. The method was published in 2021 in Genome Research by Vaisvila and colleagues, many of whom were affiliated with NEB. Following its publication and validation, the EM-Seq method was commercialized by NEB, making standardized kits available for research purposes.

== Mechanism ==
The EM-Seq protocol involves the following sequential enzymatic treatment of the input DNA:

1. Oxidation of methylated cytosines: The enzyme TET2 (Tet Methylcytosine Dioxygenase 2) is used to oxidize 5mC and 5hmC. TET2 iteratively oxidizes 5mC to 5hmC, then to 5-formylcytosine (5fC), and finally to 5-carboxylcytosine (5caC). This oxidation step serves primarily to protect the originally methylated cytosines from subsequent deamination.
2. Deamination of unmodified cytosines: An APOBEC (Apolipoprotein B mRNA Editing Enzyme, Catalytic Polypeptide-like) deaminase enzyme is then used. This enzyme specifically deaminates unmodified cytosine (C) bases, converting them into uracil (U). Crucially, the oxidized forms of methylated cytosines (like 5caC) are resistant to APOBEC-mediated deamination.

The DNA is then amplified using PCR. During amplification, uracil bases (derived from unmethylated cytosines) are read as thymine (T) by the DNA polymerase. The protected, originally methylated cytosines (now primarily 5caC or other TET2 oxidation products) are generally read as cytosine (C). The amplified library is subjected to DNA sequencing. By comparing the sequenced reads to a reference genome, positions where a C is retained indicate an originally methylated cytosine (5mC or 5hmC), while positions where a C has been converted to a T indicate an originally unmethylated cytosine.

== Applications ==
DNA methylation profiling is widely used in the fields of epigenetics research and is explored for potential diagnostic uses for diseases such as cancer. As such, EM-Seq provides an alternative approach where traditional approaches are insufficient or higher quality data is desired. For example, analysis of clinical samples with limited or degraded DNA, such as cfDNA for non-invasive monitoring or FFPE tissues from archival collections.

== See also ==
- DNA methylation
- 5-methylcytosine (5mC)
- 5-hydroxymethylcytosine (5hmC)
- Bisulfite sequencing
- Epigenetics
- TET enzymes
- APOBEC
- Whole genome sequencing
