= UDGB =

UDGB may refer to:

- Double-stranded uracil-DNA glycosylase, an enzyme
- Uracil-DNA glycosylase, an enzyme
