= SMUG1 =

Protein-coding gene in the species Homo sapiens

Identifiers
- Aliases: SMUG1, FDG, HMUDG, UNG3, single-strand-selective monofunctional uracil-DNA glycosylase 1
- External IDs: OMIM: 607753; MGI: 1918976; GeneCards: SMUG1

Gene location (Mouse)
Chr.	Chromosome 15 (mouse)
Band	15|15 F3	Start	103,061,717 bp
Band	15|15 F3	End	103,075,519 bp
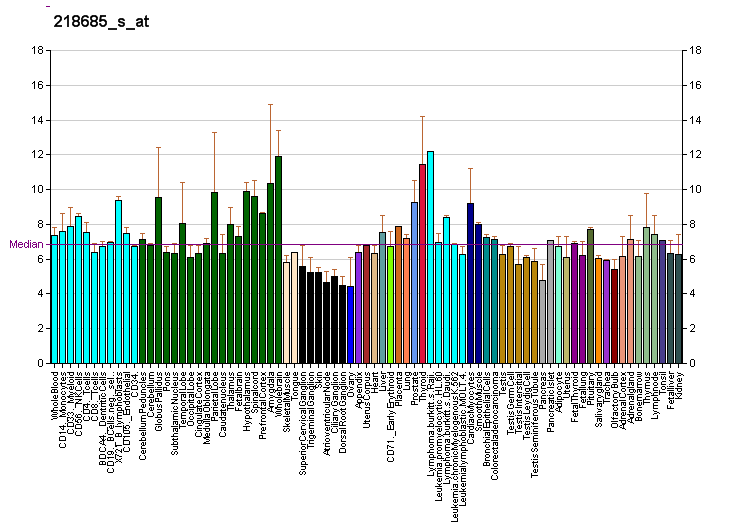
RNA expression pattern
Bgee	Human / Mouse (ortholog); n/a / Top expressed in: secondary oocyte; primary oocyte; neural layer of retina; tail of embryo; zygote; otic vesicle; hair follicle; retinal pigment epithelium; epithelium of urethra; otolith organ
BioGPS	More reference expression data
Gene ontology
Molecular function	DNA binding; uracil DNA N-glycosylase activity; DNA N-glycosylase activity; protein binding; oxidized pyrimidine nucleobase lesion DNA N-glycosylase activity; hydrolase activity; single-strand selective uracil DNA N-glycosylase activity
Cellular component	nucleolus; nucleus; nucleoplasm
Biological process	depyrimidination; cellular response to DNA damage stimulus; base-excision repair; DNA repair
Sources:Amigo / QuickGO
Orthologs
Databases	NCBI: entry; OMA: entry
Species	Human	Mouse
Entrez	23583	71726
Ensembl	ENSG00000123415	ENSMUSG00000036061
UniProt	Q53HV7	Q6P5C5
RefSeq (mRNA)	NM_001243787; NM_001243788; NM_001243789; NM_001243790; NM_001243791 NM_014311	NM_027885
RefSeq (protein)	NP_001230716; NP_001230717; NP_001230718; NP_001230719; NP_001230720 NP_055126; NP_001338166; NP_001338167; NP_001338168; NP_001338169; NP_001338170; NP_001338171; NP_001338172; NP_001338173; NP_001338174; NP_001338175; NP_001338176; NP_001338177; NP_001338178; NP_001338179; NP_001338180; NP_001338181; NP_001338182; NP_001338183; NP_001338184; NP_001338185; NP_001338186; NP_001338187; NP_001338188; NP_001338189; NP_001338190; NP_001338191	NP_082161
Location (UCSC)	n/a	Chr 15: 103.06 – 103.08 Mb
PubMed search
- Wikidata
View/Edit Human	View/Edit Mouse

Single-strand selective monofunctional uracil DNA glycosylase is an enzyme that in humans is encoded by the SMUG1 gene. SMUG1 is a glycosylase that removes uracil from single- and double-stranded DNA in nuclear chromatin, thus contributing to base excision repair.

== Function ==
SMUG1 is an important uracil-DNA glycosylases that process uracil in DNA. SMUG1 function is to remove U or its derivatives from DNA. SMUG1 is able to excise uracil from both single- and doubledstranded DNA. Other DNA glycosylases linked to U removal are UNG, TDG and MBD4. Uracil-DNA repair is essential to protect against mutations. Current evidence suggests that UNG and SMUG1 are the major enzymes responsible for the repair of the U:G mispairs. Uracil is also introduced into DNA as part of antibody gene diversification and its removal is critical to antibody diversification. UNG is known to be the major player in uracil removal but when depleted SMUG1 can provide a backup for UNG in the antibody diversification process.

In addition to uracil, SMUG1 removes several pyrimidine oxidation products. and has a specific function to remove the thymine oxidation product 5-hydroxymethyl uracil from DNA.

== Role in cancer ==
Low SMUG1 transcripts can impair DNA repair and thus increase mutation rate, enhance chromosomal instability and promote selection of more malignant clones with aggressive behavior. Loss of SMUG1 was shown to increase cancer predisposition in mice study. In addition low SMUG1 transcripts were shown to be potentially correlated with poor survival and linked to aggressive phenotype in breast cancer. Low SMUG1 expression is also associated with BRCA1, ATM, XRCC1, implying genomic instability in SMUG1 low tumors. Preclinical study where SMUG1 depletion has been shown to results in sensitivity to 5-FU chemotherapy.

Low SMUG1 in gastric cancer, however, were showing the opposite result, promoting cancer survival and resistance to therapy. One possible explanation is that in gastric cancer inflammation is the driver for carcinogenesis and low concentrations of SMUG1 can be beneficial in repairing oxidative base damage (commonly seen in inflammatory environment). Thus SMUG1 might have complex roles in carcinogenesis and act differently based on the type of cancer and its properties.

=== Role in drug response ===
5-Fluorouracil (5-FU) is a widely used in the treatment of a range of common cancers that causes DNA damage via two mechanisms. FU is thought to kill cells via the inhibition of thymidylate synthase and also deprive cells of TTP during DNA replication, which leads to the introduction of uracil in DNA causing the fragmentation of newly synthesized DNA. Also, 5-FU is directly incorporated into DNA. UNG and SMUG1 are most likely to tackle the genomic incorporation of uracil and 5-FU during replication. Current research suggests that of SMUG1 but not UNG corresponds to increase in sensitivity to 5-FU. It was suggested that SMUG1 can be potentially used as a predictive biomarkers of drug response and a mechanism for acquired resistance in certain types of tumors.

SMUG1 glycosylase is a key enzyme for repairing lesions generated during oxidative base damage. Investigation of SMUG1 expression in gastric cancers showed that overexpressed SMUG1 was correlated with patients’ poor survival. In gastric cancer inflammation is the driver for carcinogenesis. And thus one possible explanation is that cancer cells are under considerable oxidative stress compared to normal cells and unregulation of SMUG1 is essential for the repair of oxidative base damage and survival in cancer cells. In this case elevation of SMUG1 as opposed to depletion can be potentially used as a biomarker for survival.

== Interactions ==
SMUG1 has been shown to interact with RBPMS and with DKC1.

== Interactive pathway map ==
Click on genes, proteins and metabolites below to link to respective articles. (Note: The interactive pathway map can be edited at WikiPathways: "FluoropyrimidineActivity_WP1601".)

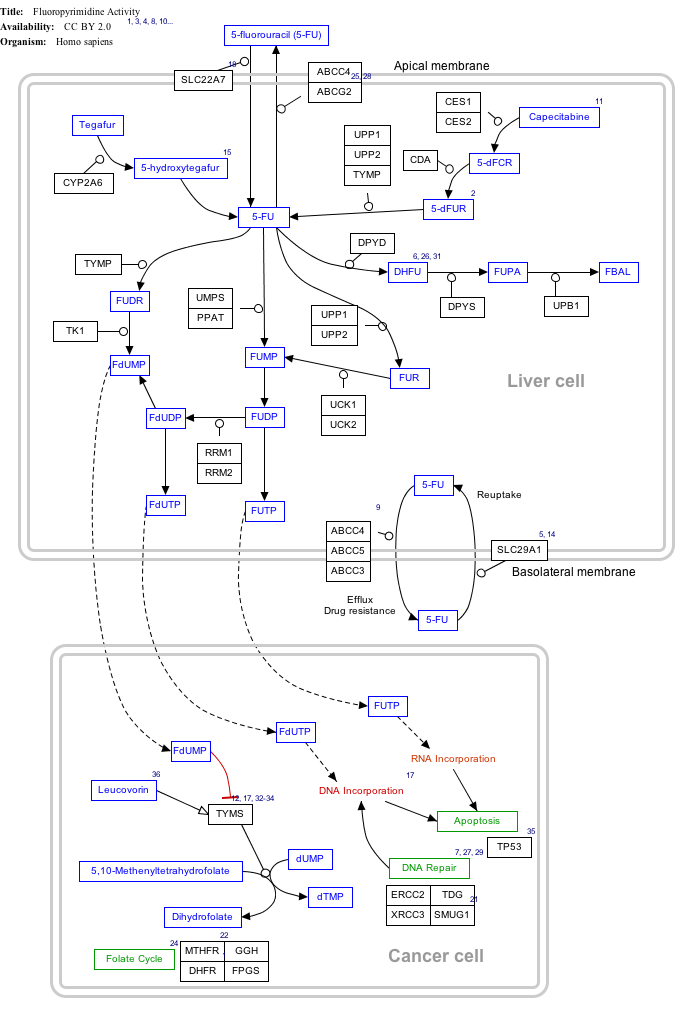

Fluorouracil (5-FU) Activity edit

== See also ==
- DNA-deoxyinosine glycosylase
- Uracil-DNA glycosylase
- Thymine-DNA glycosylase
