= C5H5N3O3 =

The molecular formula C_{5}H_{5}N_{3}O_{3} may refer to:

- 6-Amino-5-nitropyridin-2-one
- 5-Carboxylcytosine
