= TRNA (cytosine34-C5)-methyltransferase =

Identifiers
- EC no.: 2.1.1.203

Databases
- IntEnz: IntEnz view
- BRENDA: BRENDA entry
- ExPASy: NiceZyme view
- KEGG: KEGG entry
- MetaCyc: metabolic pathway
- PRIAM: profile
- PDB structures: RCSB PDB PDBe PDBsum
Search
- PMC: articles
- PubMed: articles
- NCBI: proteins

TRNA (cytosine34-C5)-methyltransferase (EC 2.1.1.203, hTrm4 Mtase, hTrm4 methyltransferase, hTrm4 (gene), tRNA:m5C-methyltransferase) is an enzyme with systematic name S-adenosyl-L-methionine:tRNA (cytosine34-C5)-methyltransferase. This enzyme catalyses the following chemical reaction

S-adenosyl-L-methionine + cytosine^{34} in tRNA precursor $\rightleftharpoons$ S-adenosyl-L-homocysteine + 5-methylcytosine^{34} in tRNA precursor

The human enzyme is specific for C^{5}-methylation of cytosine^{34} in tRNA precursors.
