= 5-Carboxylcytosine =

Names
- Preferred IUPAC name 4-Amino-2-oxo-1,2-dihydropyrimidine-5-carboxylic acid
- Other names: Cytosine-5-carboxylic acid; 5caC

Identifiers
CAS Number	3650-93-9
3D model (JSmol)	Interactive image
ChEBI	CHEBI:76793
ChemSpider	69639
ECHA InfoCard	100.020.810
EC Number	222-890-1
KEGG	C20769
PubChem CID	77213
UNII	760CU98B9K
CompTox Dashboard (EPA)	DTXSID70190003
- InChI: InChI=1S/C5H5N3O3/c6-3-2(4(9)10)1-7-5(11)8-3/h1H,(H,9,10)(H3,6,7,8,11) Key: BLQMCTXZEMGOJM-UHFFFAOYSA-N
- SMILES: C1=NC(=O)NC(=C1C(=O)O)N

Properties
Chemical formula	C_{5}H_{5}N_{3}O_{3}
Molar mass	155.113 g·mol^{−1}

Hazards
- Occupational safety and health (OHS/OSH)
Main hazards	Irritant
- Except where otherwise noted, data are given for materials in their standard state (at 25 °C [77 °F], 100 kPa). Infobox references

5-Carboxylcytosine (5caC) is a modified nucleobase, derived from cytosine, that plays a significant role as an intermediate in the process of active DNA demethylation. It is generated through the oxidation of 5-methylcytosine (5mC) via 5-hydroxymethylcytosine (5hmC) and 5-formylcytosine (5fC), catalyzed by the TET family of dioxygenases. 5caC represents the final oxidative state in this pathway before the base is typically removed and replaced with an unmodified cytosine by Terminal deoxynucleotidyl transferase (TdT) or Thymine DNA glycosylase (TDG) by base excision repair.

== Discovery ==
5-Carboxylcytosine, along with 5-formylcytosine (5fC), was identified as an oxidation product generated by the TET enzymes acting on 5-methylcytosine (5mC) and 5-hydroxymethylcytosine (5hmC). Studies published around 2011 demonstrated that TET enzymes could iteratively oxidize 5mC, leading first to 5hmC, then 5fC, and finally 5caC. Researchers subsequently confirmed the presence of both 5fC and 5caC, albeit at very low levels, in the genomic DNA of mouse embryonic stem cells and various mouse organs, establishing them as endogenous DNA modifications.

== Structure and properties ==
5-Carboxylcytosine is structurally identical to cytosine except for the presence of a carboxyl group (–COOH) attached to the C5 position of the pyrimidine ring. The carboxyl group is electron-withdrawing and distinguishes it significantly from cytosine, 5mC, and 5hmC in terms of chemical properties (weakened hydrogen bonding) and biological recognition (reduced base pair stability). At physiological pH, the carboxyl group (with a pK_{a} around 2.1) is typically ionized (–COO^{−}), while the N3 position has a pK_{a} around 4.2.

== Significance ==
The primary significance of 5caC lies in its role as a key intermediate in active DNA demethylation. By facilitating the removal of methylation marks through the TET-TDG-BER pathway, 5caC contributes to the dynamic regulation of DNA methylation patterns, which is crucial for epigenetic regulation. However, recent studies suggest that 5caC may have its own functional significance such as increased pausing, backtracking, and reduced fidelity of RNAPII.

== See also ==
- 5-Methylcytosine (5mC)
- 5-Hydroxymethylcytosine (5hmC)
- 5-Formylcytosine (5fC)
- DNA methylation
- Thymine-DNA glycosylase
- Base excision repair
