= DNA-deoxyinosine glycosylase =

Identifiers
- EC no.: 3.2.2.15
- CAS no.: 68247-62-1

Databases
- IntEnz: IntEnz view
- BRENDA: BRENDA entry
- ExPASy: NiceZyme view
- KEGG: KEGG entry
- MetaCyc: metabolic pathway
- PRIAM: profile
- PDB structures: RCSB PDB PDBe PDBsum
Search
- PMC: articles
- PubMed: articles
- NCBI: proteins

DNA-deoxyinosine glycosylase (EC 3.2.2.15, DNA(hypoxanthine) glycohydrolase, deoxyribonucleic acid glycosylase, hypoxanthine-DNA glycosylase) is an enzyme with systematic name DNA-deoxyinosine deoxyribohydrolase. This enzyme is involved in DNA damage repair and targets hypoxanthine bases.

DNA is constantly exposed to chemical reactions within its cellular environment, leading to undesired structural changes and compromising the integrity of genetic information. Common changes to bases include oxidation, alkylation, or the deamination of bases. Observed deamination in DNA bases are cytosine to uracil, guanine to xanthine and oxanine, or adenine to hypoxanthine. These single-base legions are removed through the base excision repair (BER) pathway, a mechanism initiated by DNA glycosylase to remove a mismatch or mutated base.

DNA glycosylases are ubiquitous, observed in species of all kingdoms of life, including archaea, eubacteria, eukaryotes, and large DNA viruses. They can be further subdivided into four specific categories: the uracil DNA glycosylases (UDGs), the helix-hairpin-helix (HhH) glycosylases, the 3-methyl-purine glycosylase (MPG), and the endonuclease VIII-like (NEIL) glycosylases. However, DNA deoxyinosine glycosylase activity, the removal of a hypoxanthine base, is observed within the uracil DNA glycosylase superfamily. Currently, there are 6 families within the DNA Uracil Glycosylase superfamily, each classified based on their sequence homology, and biochemical and structural similarities. Uracil and hypoxanthine activity is a feature that is particular to UDG families, namely family 3 SMUG1-like enzymes and more recently the newly identified family 6 enzymes, which exhibits only hypoxanthine activity specifically.

== Nomenclature ==
- EC 3.2.2.15
- EC Tree:
  - 3 Hydrolases: Class of enzymes that breaks chemical bonds using water.
  - 3.2 Glycosylases: Class of hydrolases that target glycosyl compounds.
  - 3.2.2 Hydrolyzing N-Glycosyl Compound: Subclass of glycosylase that targets N-glycosidic bonds.
  - 3.2.2.15 DNA Deoxyinosine glycosylase: Glycosylase that hydrolyzes the N-glycosidic bond in deoxyinosine, releasing a free hypoxanthine in the process.

== Reaction mechanism ==
DNA damage is caused by environmental and endogenous agents, that can create highly mutagenic lesions or compromise genomic stability. In order to preserve genomic sequence information, cells must counteract DNA damage through one of its five major pathways: base excision repair (BER), nucleotide excision repair (NER), mismatch repair (MMR), homologous recombination (HR), and non-homologous end joining (NHEJ).

While hypoxanthine, or inosine when attached to a ribose, is a naturally occurring base in human tRNA or in wobble base pairing, it is mistakenly incorporated into DNA either through the deamination of an adenine base pair, or as inosine triphosphate (ITP), formed through ATP deamination. The mutated base gets removed through the base excision repair pathway, a two step mechanism carried out by a glycosylase and AP endonuclease. DNA deoxyinosine glycosylase initiates the process through hydrolytic cleavage of the hypoxanthine base, releasing a free hypoxanthine and creating an abasic, or AP site. AP endonuclease follows glycosylase activity by recognizing this AP site and nicking the phosphodiester backbone at the specified location. DNA polymerase and DNA ligase then completes the process by incorporating the correct base pair and closing the nick.

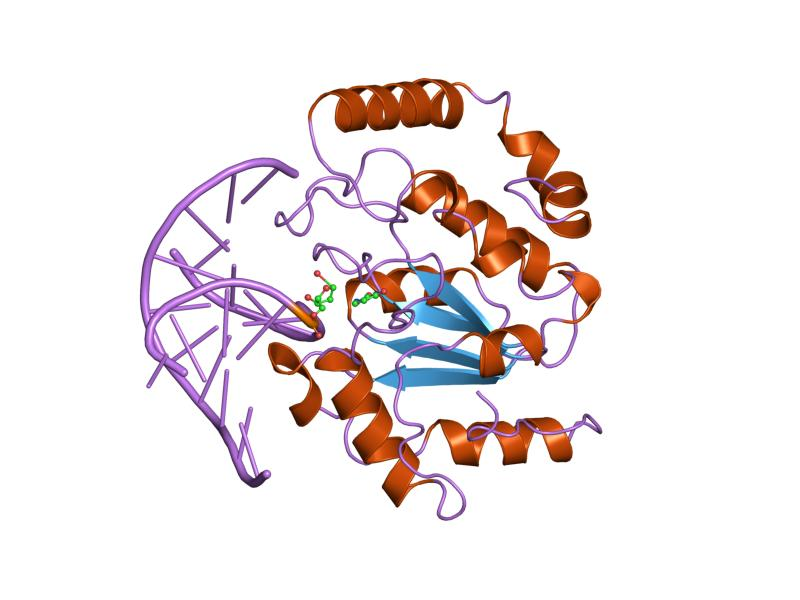
PDB 4SKN model suggests catalytic mechanism of UDG family, which includes baseflipping mechanism in which uracil interacts with a uracil-binding pocket.

The UDG superfamily typically contains a four-strand β-sheet surrounded by α-helices and undergoes the same or a similar mechanism to create abasic sites. The general catalytic mechanism involves activating the leaving group, stabilization of the oxocarbenium ion, and positioning of a water molecule. Structural studies on human uracil DNA glycosylase (PDB 4KSN) suggests a base-flipping mechanism that requires a few key residues. L272 allows the enzyme to intercalate into the major groove of DNA, allowing additional interactions of uracil with the uracil-binding pocket, which in this model includes His 268, Gin 144, Phe 158, Asn 145, Asn 204, and Tyr 147. When uracil sits in the binding pocket, it is flipped out of the DNA base-stack and in proximity to the water molecule activated by residue D145. Hydrogen bonding between water and aspartate prepares the water molecule for nucleophilic attack of the N-glycosidic bond, cleaving a base and leaving behind an AP site.

== Structure ==
Recent crystal structure and phylogenetic studies of the family 3 SMUG1-like DNA glycosylase from Pedobacter heparinus (PDB 5H0K) reveals both hypoxanthine/xanthine and uracil activity and has been classified into a new subfamily, Family 6. While crystal studies reveal folds that share similarity to SMUG1 enzymes, the phe SMUG2 UDG displays distinct differences in local structure based on a comparison of the three motifs in all UDG families that are involved in recognition and catalysis. Analysis of motif 1 reveals a GINPG sequence, similar to family 2 UDGs. The N63 residue is highly conserved and also appears in families 2 and 3, presumably key for the positioning of the water molecule. S124 is the first residue in motif 3 phe SMUG2, but is typically an asparagine in other UDG families. Curiously, a mutation in which serine is replaced with asparagine reveals increased catalytic activity as well as broadens activity to include single-stranded uracil-containing DNA and G/T base pairs. This suggests that S124 may play a key role in increasing substrate specificity. Motif 2 begins with highly conserved H205, which aids in UDG activity by forming short-distance hydrogen bonds with the O2 of uracil. While crucial for UDG activity involving A/U or G/U recognition, mutation of this residue has no effect on hypoxanthine and xanthine DNA glycosylase activity, however.

== See also ==
- Thymine-DNA glycosylase
