= Glucosyl-DNA beta-glucosyltransferase =

Class of enzymes

Identifiers
- EC no.: 2.4.1.28
- CAS no.: 9030-15-3

Databases
- IntEnz: IntEnz view
- BRENDA: BRENDA entry
- ExPASy: NiceZyme view
- KEGG: KEGG entry
- MetaCyc: metabolic pathway
- PRIAM: profile
- PDB structures: RCSB PDB PDBe PDBsum
Search
- PMC: articles
- PubMed: articles
- NCBI: proteins

In enzymology, a glucosyl-DNA beta-glucosyltransferase (EC 2.4.1.28) is an enzyme that catalyzes the chemical reaction in which a beta-D-glucosyl residue is transferred from UDP-glucose to a glucosylhydroxymethylcytosine residue in DNA. This enzyme resembles DNA beta-glucosyltransferase in that respect.

This enzyme belongs to the family of glycosyltransferases, specifically the hexosyltransferases. The systematic name of this enzyme class is UDP-glucose:D-glucosyl-DNA beta-D-glucosyltransferase. Other names in common use include T6-glucosyl-HMC-beta-glucosyl transferase, T6-beta-glucosyl transferase, uridine diphosphoglucose-glucosyldeoxyribonucleate, and beta-glucosyltransferase.
