= Treat Baldwin Johnson =

American chemist

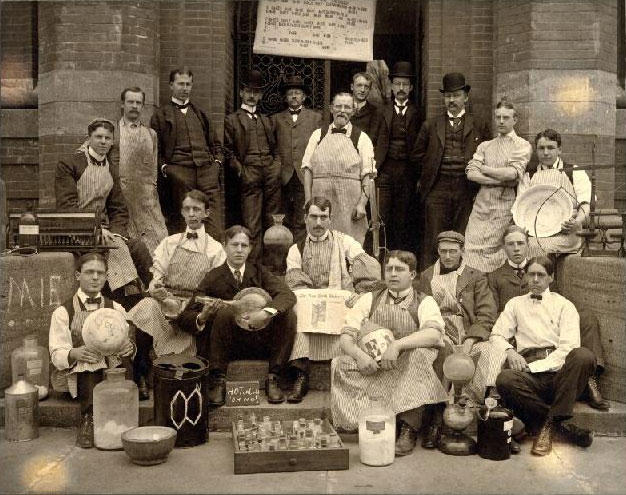
- Sheffield Scientific School chemistry class, 1898. Johnson is seated center, holding a copy of The New York Voice.
- Born: 29 March 1875; Bethany, Connecticut
- Died: 28 July 1947 (aged 72)
- Education: Yale University
- Spouse: Emma Estelle Amerman
- Awards: Nichols Medal (1918)
- Scientific career
- Fields: Organic Chemistry; Natural Products
- Workplaces: Sheffield Scientific School, Yale University
- Thesis: (1901)
- Doctoral advisor: H L Wheeler

Treat Baldwin Johnson (29 March 1875 – 28 July 1947) was an American organic chemist and Sterling Professor at Yale University from 1928–1943.

== Early life and education ==
Treat Baldwin Johnson was born in Bethany, Connecticut, on 29 March 1875, the oldest of three sons of Dwight Lauren Johnson and Harriet Adeline Baldwin. He was educated at Ansonia high school and graduated from the Sheffield Scientific School of Yale University in 1898, where he obtained work as a laboratory assistant and began a Ph.D. degree under the supervision of H L Wheeler. By the time of its completion in 1901, Johnson had published seven scientific papers relating mainly to imidoesters.

== Career ==
Johnson became an instructor of chemistry at the Sheffield Scientific School in 1902 and then an assistant professor in 1909. He specialized in organic chemistry and was promoted to full professor in 1914. In 1918, he received the Nichols Medal of the American Chemical Society in recognition of his work on pyrimidines. and in 1919 was elected to the US National Academy of Sciences. Yale awarded him a Sterling Professorship in 1928, which he retained until his retirement in 1943.

== Research ==
Johnson supervised 94 graduate students, together generating 182 papers on pyrimidine chemistry in a total research output of 358 publications and 15 patents. The focus was organic synthesis as applied to nucleobases and therapeutic substances but he also worked on the chemical degradation of silk, on organic sulfur compounds, and on proteins. He was the co-editor with E. M. Shelton, one of his students, of the owner's manual for A. C. Gilbert Company's chemistry sets. Together with R. D. Coghill, Johnson was the first to discover the existence of 5-methylcytosine in nature, from tuberculinic acid, a nucleotide of Mycobacterium tuberculosis.

=== Selected publications ===
- Wheeler, Henry L.; Johnson, Treat B. (1907). "IV. Researches on Pyrimidins: On a Color Test for Uracil and Cytosin Plate II". Journal of Biological Chemistry. 3 (3): 183–189. doi:10.1016/S0021-9258(17)45991-6.
- Johnson, Treat B. (1914). "The Origin of Purines in Plants". Journal of the American Chemical Society. 36 (2): 337–345. doi:10.1021/ja02179a013.
- Johnson, Treat B. (1918). "The Development of Pyrimidine Chemistry–Medal Address". Journal of Industrial & Engineering Chemistry. 10 (4): 306–312. doi:10.1021/ie50100a028.
- Shelton, Elbert M.; Johnson, Treat B. (1930). "Silk—A Field for Research1". Industrial & Engineering Chemistry. 22 (4): 387–390. doi:10.1021/ie50244a025.
- Johnson, Treat B.; Hahn, Dorothy A. (1933). "Pyrimidines: Their Amino and Aminoöxy Derivatives". Chemical Reviews. 13 (2): 193–303. doi:10.1021/cr60045a002.
- Johnson, Treat B. (1946). Fun with Gilbert chemistry. A.C. Gilbert Co. pp. 1–128. ASIN B0007HIS8W.

== Personal life ==
Johnson married Emma Estelle Amerman in 1904; they had no children.
