= RBPMS =

Protein-coding gene in the species Homo sapiens

Identifiers
- Aliases: RBPMS, HERMES, RNA binding protein with multiple splicing, RNA binding protein, mRNA processing factor
- External IDs: OMIM: 601558; MGI: 1334446; GeneCards: RBPMS
Available structures
PDB	Ortholog search: PDBe RCSB
PDB	List of PDB id codes 5DET, 5CYJ

Gene location (Human)
Chr.	Chromosome 8 (human)
Band	8p12	Start	30,384,511 bp
Band	8p12	End	30,572,256 bp

Gene location (Mouse)
Chr.	Chromosome 8 (mouse)
Band	8|8 A4	Start	34,272,671 bp
Band	8|8 A4	End	34,419,891 bp
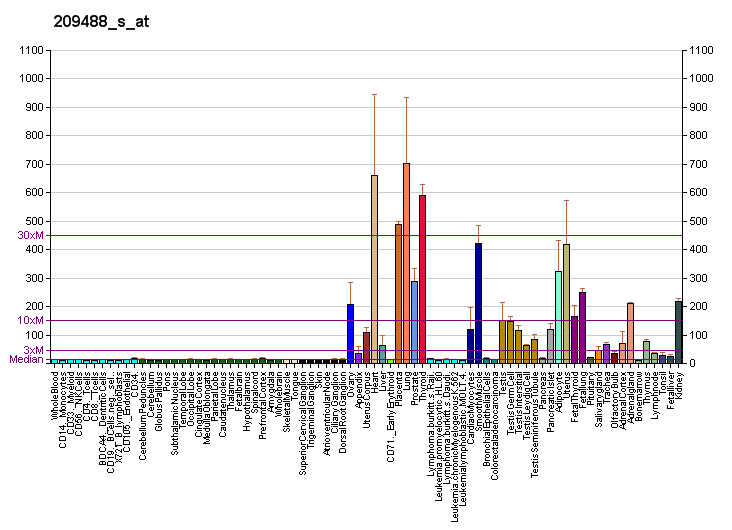

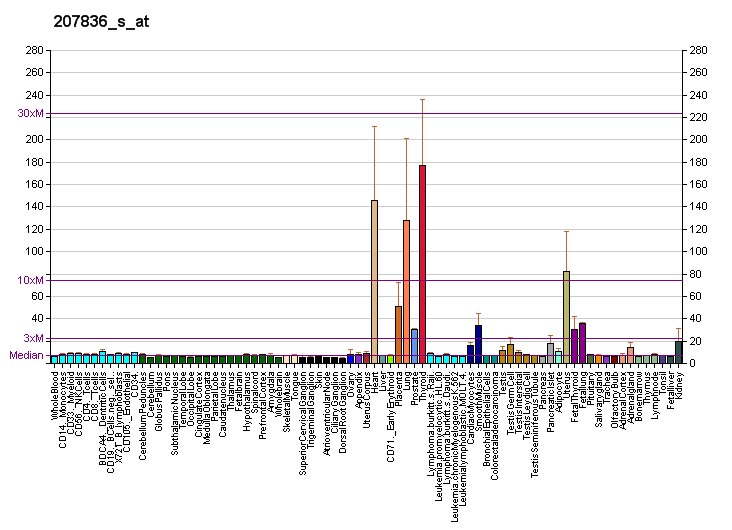

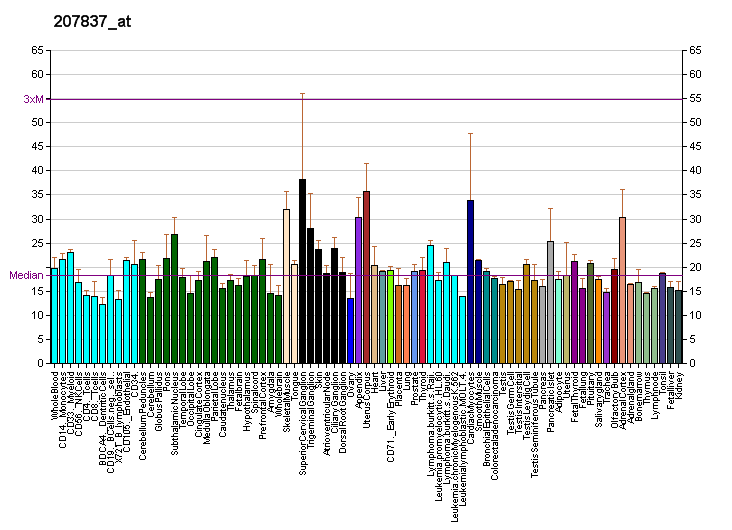
RNA expression pattern
Bgee	Human / Mouse (ortholog); Top expressed in: popliteal artery; tibial arteries; gastric mucosa; right coronary artery; thoracic aorta; ascending aorta; left coronary artery; Descending thoracic aorta; muscle layer of sigmoid colon; body of uterus / Top expressed in: ascending aorta; aortic valve; atrium; interventricular septum; tail of embryo; tunica media of zone of aorta; embryo; genital tubercle; zygote; right ventricle; More reference expression data
BioGPS	More reference expression data
Gene ontology
Molecular function	transcription coactivator activity; protein binding; poly(A) binding; nucleic acid binding; protein homodimerization activity; RNA binding; U1 snRNA binding; snRNA stem-loop binding; mRNA binding
Cellular component	nucleus; nucleoplasm; P-body; cytoplasmic stress granule; U1 snRNP; cytoplasm; cytosol
Biological process	positive regulation of pathway-restricted SMAD protein phosphorylation; RNA processing; regulation of transcription, DNA-templated; transcription, DNA-templated; positive regulation of SMAD protein signal transduction; response to oxidative stress; mRNA splicing, via spliceosome; positive regulation of nucleic acid-templated transcription
Sources:Amigo / QuickGO
Orthologs
Databases	NCBI: entry; OMA: entry
Species	Human	Mouse
Entrez	11030	19663
Ensembl	ENSG00000157110	ENSMUSG00000031586
UniProt	Q93062	Q9WVB0
RefSeq (mRNA)	NM_001008710; NM_001008711; NM_001008712; NM_006867	NM_001042674; NM_001042675; NM_001286168; NM_019733
RefSeq (protein)	NP_001008710; NP_001008711; NP_001008712; NP_006858	NP_001036139; NP_001036140; NP_001273097; NP_062707
Location (UCSC)	Chr 8: 30.38 – 30.57 Mb	Chr 8: 34.27 – 34.42 Mb
PubMed search
- Wikidata
View/Edit Human	View/Edit Mouse

RNA-binding protein with multiple splicing is a protein that in humans is encoded by the RBPMS gene.

== Function ==
This gene encodes a member of the RRM family of RNA-binding proteins. The RRM domain is between 80-100 amino acids in length and family members contain one to four copies of the domain. The RRM domain consists of two short stretches of conserved sequence called RNP1 and RNP2, as well as a few highly conserved hydrophobic residues. The protein encoded by this gene has a single, putative RRM domain in its N-terminus. Alternative splicing results in multiple transcript variants encoding different isoforms.

It is uniquely expressed in retinal ganglion cells in the mammalian retina, for reasons unknown.

== Interactions ==
RBPMS has been shown to interact with SMUG1.
