= Tuberculinic acid =

Noncanonical nucleic acid

Tuberculinic acid is a noncanonical nucleic acid initially identified as the poison of Tubercle bacillus (Mycobacterium tuberculosis), the principal causative bacterium of tuberculosis. Its discovery was one of the most important landmarks in understanding tuberculosis and in molecular biology. It is regarded as the most toxic component of the bacillus. It was from this compound that DNA methylation was discovered as it was the first molecule found to contain 5-methylcytosine. In addition it contains thymine, guanine and cytosine.

== Discovery ==
It was first identified by a German chemist W.G. Ruppel in 1898 while trying to isolate the bacterial toxin responsible for tuberculosis. From the crushed bacilli, specifically the protein tuberculin, he isolated two toxic substances, namely a basic compound which he called tuberculosamine, and a nucleotide he named tuberculisäure, later to be anglicised to tuberculinic acid. He claimed that the tuberculosamin was bound to the nucleotide. Ruppel also found that his new compound was the most toxic component of the bacillus, 2.5 to 6 times more potent than tuberculin, the proteinaceous toxin.

In 1925, Treat Baldwin Johnson and Coghill were detected a minor amount of a methylated cytosine derivative as a product of hydrolysis of tuberculinic acid, from avian tubercle bacilli, with sulfuric acid. This report was seriously challenged because others failed to reproduce the result after a series of tests. But Johnson and Coghill were in fact proved correct. In 1948, Hotchkiss separated the nucleic acids of DNA from calf thymus using paper chromatography, by which he detected a unique methylated cytosine, quite distinct from cytosine and uracil.
