= DNA beta-glucosyltransferase =

Class of enzymes

Identifiers
- EC no.: 2.4.1.27
- CAS no.: 9030-14-2

Databases
- BRENDA: enzyme data
- ExPASy: NiceZyme view
- KEGG: enzyme entry
- MetaCyc: metabolic pathway
- Rhea: reactions
- PDB structures: RCSB PDB PDBe PDBsum
Search
- PMC: articles
- PubMed: articles
- NCBI: proteins

In enzymology, a DNA beta-glucosyltransferase (EC 2.4.1.27) is an enzyme that catalyzes the chemical reaction in which a beta-D-glucosyl residue is transferred from UDP-glucose to an hydroxymethylcytosine residue in DNA. It is analogous to the enzyme DNA alpha-glucosyltransferase.

This enzyme belongs to the family of glycosyltransferases, specifically the hexosyltransferases. The systematic name of this enzyme class is UDP-glucose:DNA beta-D-glucosyltransferase. Other names in common use include T4-HMC-beta-glucosyl transferase, T4-beta-glucosyl transferase, T4 phage beta-glucosyltransferase, UDP glucose-DNA beta-glucosyltransferase, and uridine diphosphoglucose-deoxyribonucleate beta-glucosyltransferase.

== Structural studies ==
As of late 2007, 20 structures have been solved for this class of enzymes, with PDB accession codes PDB: 1BGT, PDB: 1BGU, PDB: 1C3J, PDB: 1IXY, PDB: 1J39, PDB: 1JEJ, PDB: 1JG6, PDB: 1JG7, PDB: 1JIU, PDB: 1JIV, PDB: 1JIX, PDB: 1M5R, PDB: 1NVK, PDB: 1NZD, PDB: 1NZF, PDB: 1QKJ, PDB: 1SXP, PDB: 1SXQ, PDB: 2BGT, and PDB: 2BGU.

== Bacteriophage T4 beta-glucosyltransferase ==
T4-Gluco-transf
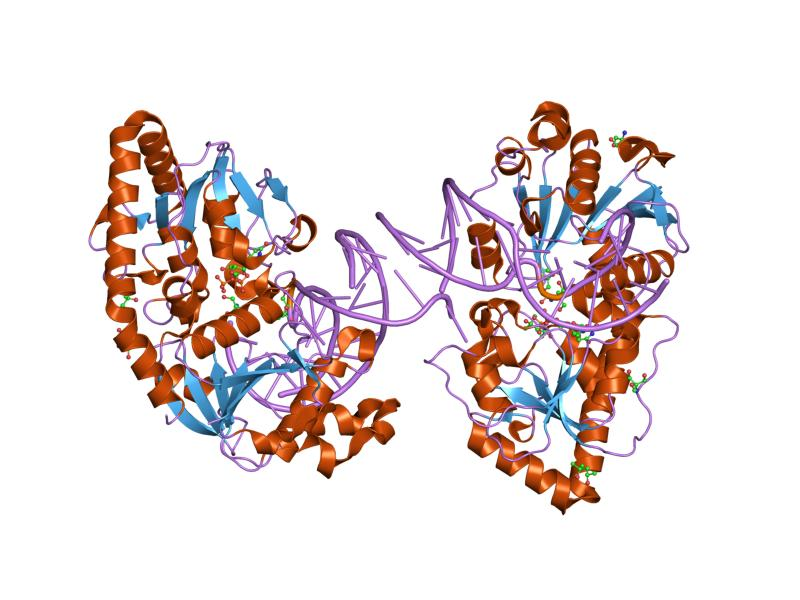
- ternary complex of t4 phage bgt with udp and a 13 mer dna duplex

Identifiers
- Symbol: T4-Gluco-transf
- Pfam: PF09198
- InterPro: IPR015281
- SCOP2: 1jix / SCOPe / SUPFAM
Available protein structures:
- PDB: IPR015281 PF09198 (ECOD; PDBsum)
- AlphaFold: IPR015281; PF09198

In molecular biology, Bacteriophage T4 beta-glucosyltransferase refers to a protein domain found in a virus of Escherichia coli named bacteriophage T4. Members of this family are enzymes encoded by bacteriophage T4, which modify DNA by transferring glucose from uridine diphosphoglucose to 5-hydroxymethyl cytosine bases of phage T4 DNA.

== Function ==
Beta-glucosyltransferase is an enzyme, or more specifically an inverting glycosyltransferase (GT). In other words, it transfers glucose from uridine diphospho-glucose (UDPglucose) to an acceptor, modified DNA through beta-Glycosidic bond. The role of the enzyme is to protect the infecting viral DNA from the bacteria's restriction enzymes. Glucosylation prevents the virus DNA from being cut up. Furthermore, glucosylation may aid gene expression of the bacteriophage by influencing transcription.

== Structure ==
This structure has both alpha helices and beta strands.
