= Deoxycytidylate 5-hydroxymethyltransferase =

Identifiers
- EC no.: 2.1.2.8
- CAS no.: 9012-68-4

Databases
- IntEnz: IntEnz view
- BRENDA: BRENDA entry
- ExPASy: NiceZyme view
- KEGG: KEGG entry
- MetaCyc: metabolic pathway
- PRIAM: profile
- PDB structures: RCSB PDB PDBe PDBsum
- Gene Ontology: AmiGO / QuickGO
Search
- PMC: articles
- PubMed: articles
- NCBI: proteins

Deoxycytidylate 5-hydroxymethyltransferase (EC 2.1.2.8) is an enzyme that catalyzes the chemical reaction

deoxycytidine dihydrogen phosphate
+ 5,10-CH_{2}-THF
H_{2}O
H_{2}O
5-hydroxymethyldeoxycytidylic acid
+ THF

This tetrahydrofolate–dependent enzyme catalyzes a reversible substitution of the hydroxymethyl group from the cofactor 10-formyltetrahydrofolate (5,10-CH_{2}-THF) to deoxycytidine dihydrogen phosphate, giving 5-hydroxymethyldeoxycytidylic acid and tetrahydrofolic acid (THF). The enzyme was characterised from Escherichia coli.

This enzyme belongs to the family of transferases that transfer one-carbon groups, specifically the hydroxymethyl-, formyl- and related transferases. The systematic name of this enzyme class is 5,10-methylenetetrahydrofolate:deoxycytidylate 5-hydroxymethyltransferase. Other names in common use include dCMP hydroxymethylase, d-cytidine 5'-monophosphate hydroxymethylase, deoxyCMP hydroxymethylase, deoxycytidylate hydroxymethylase, and deoxycytidylic hydroxymethylase. This enzyme participates in pyrimidine metabolism.

== Structural studies ==
As of late 2007, 3 structures have been solved for this class of enzymes, with PDB accession codes 1B49, 1B5D, and 1B5E.
