= DNA alpha-glucosyltransferase =

Class of enzymes

Identifiers
- EC no.: 2.4.1.26
- CAS no.: 9030-13-1

Databases
- IntEnz: IntEnz view
- BRENDA: BRENDA entry
- ExPASy: NiceZyme view
- KEGG: KEGG entry
- MetaCyc: metabolic pathway
- PRIAM: profile
- PDB structures: RCSB PDB PDBe PDBsum
Search
- PMC: articles
- PubMed: articles
- NCBI: proteins

In enzymology, a DNA alpha-glucosyltransferase (EC 2.4.1.26) is an enzyme that catalyzes the chemical reaction in which an alpha-D-glucosyl residue is transferred from UDP-glucose to a hydroxymethylcytosine residue in DNA.

This enzyme belongs to the family of glycosyltransferases, specifically the hexosyltransferases. The systematic name of this enzyme class is UDP-glucose:DNA alpha-D-glucosyltransferase. Other names in common use include uridine diphosphoglucose-deoxyribonucleate, alpha-glucosyltransferase, UDP-glucose-DNA alpha-glucosyltransferase, uridine diphosphoglucose-deoxyribonucleate, alpha-glucosyltransferase, T2-HMC-alpha-glucosyl transferase, T4-HMC-alpha-glucosyl transferase, and T6-HMC-alpha-glucosyl transferase.

== Structural studies ==
As of late 2007, 5 structures have been solved for this class of enzymes, with PDB accession codes 1XV5, 1Y6F, 1Y6G, 1Y8Z, and 1YA6.
