= Double-stranded uracil-DNA glycosylase =

Class of enzymes

Identifiers
- EC no.: 3.2.2.28

Databases
- IntEnz: IntEnz view
- BRENDA: BRENDA entry
- ExPASy: NiceZyme view
- KEGG: KEGG entry
- MetaCyc: metabolic pathway
- PRIAM: profile
- PDB structures: RCSB PDB PDBe PDBsum
Search
- PMC: articles
- PubMed: articles
- NCBI: proteins

Double-stranded uracil-DNA glycosylase (EC 3.2.2.28, Mug, double-strand uracil-DNA glycosylase, Dug, dsUDG, double-stranded DNA specific UDG, dsDNA specific UDG, UdgB, G:T/U mismatch-specific DNA glycosylase, UDG) is an enzyme with systematic name uracil-double-stranded DNA deoxyribohydrolase (uracil-releasing). This enzyme catalyses a specific chemical reaction: it hydrolyses mismatched double-stranded DNA and polynucleotides, releasing free uracil.

This enzyme is not active on DNA containing a T/G mispair or single-stranded DNA.
