= 5-Formylcytosine =

Names
- Preferred IUPAC name 4-Amino-2-oxo-1,2-dihydropyrimidine-5-carbaldehyde

Identifiers
CAS Number	4425-59-6
3D model (JSmol)	Interactive image
ChEBI	CHEBI:76794
ChemSpider	9161502
PubChem CID	10986305
CompTox Dashboard (EPA)	DTXSID701336487
- InChI: InChI=1S/C5H5N3O2/c6-4-3(2-9)1-7-5(10)8-4/h1-2H,(H3,6,7,8,10) Key: FHSISDGOVSHJRW-UHFFFAOYSA-N
- SMILES: C1=NC(=O)NC(=C1C=O)N

Properties
Chemical formula	C_{5}H_{5}N_{3}O_{2}
Molar mass	139.114 g·mol^{−1}
Appearance	Yellow solid
- Except where otherwise noted, data are given for materials in their standard state (at 25 °C [77 °F], 100 kPa). verify (what is ?) Infobox references

5-Formylcytosine (5fC) is a pyrimidine nitrogen base derived from cytosine. In the context of nucleic acid chemistry and biology, it is regarded as an epigenetic marker. Discovered in 2011 in mammalian embryonic stem cells by Thomas Carell's research group the modified nucleoside was more recently confirmed to be relevant both as an intermediate in the active demethylation pathway and as a standalone epigenetic marker. In mammals, 5fC is formed by oxidation of 5-hydroxymethylcytosine (5hmC) a reaction mediated by TET enzymes. Its molecular formula is C_{5}H_{5}N_{3}O_{2.}

== Localization ==
Similarly to the related cytosine modifications 5-methylcytosine (5mC) and 5hmC, 5fC is broadly distributed across the mammalian genome, although it is much more rarely occurring. The specific concentration values vary significantly depending on the cell type. 5fC can be aberrantly expressed in distinct sets of tissue that can indicate different tumor onsets and canceration.

== Functions ==
The exact functions of 5fC have not been yet precisely defined, although it is likely to play key roles in at least two distinct frameworks. Firstly, 5fC serves as an intermediate of the active demethylation pathway, a process that contributes to the DNA maintenance and integrity by replacing 5mC with canonical cytosine. A central dilemma regarding 5fC (and epigenetics in general) is how reader proteins recognise their substrates with such high specificity over the overwhelming background. Thymine-DNA glycosylase (TDG), a protein which is involved in the removal of 5fC from DNA in mammals, is especially interesting in this context. Secondly, 5fC can exist as an independent, stable modification, but its role in this context is still blurry.

== 5fC impact on DNA structure and flexibility ==
The understanding of the impact of 5fC on DNA physical properties is to date limited. Recent studies have reported contradictory findings regarding the structural impact of 5fC on DNA. On the other hand, several researchers working independently have identified 5fC to distinctly increase DNA flexibility. 5fC also curtails DNA double helix stability and increases base pair opening.

== See also ==
- 5-Methylcytosine
- 5-Hydroxymethylcytosine
- Base excision repair
- Epigenetics
