= Glycosylase =

Glycosylases (EC 3.2) are enzymes that hydrolyze glycosyl compounds. They are a type of hydrolase (EC 3). In turn, glycosylases are divided into two groups: glycosidases—enzymes that hydrolyze O- and S-glycosyl compounds (EC 3.2.1) -- and enzymes that hydrolyze N-glycosyl compounds (EC 3.2.2).
