= Thymine-DNA glycosylase =

Protein-coding gene in the species Homo sapiens

TDG
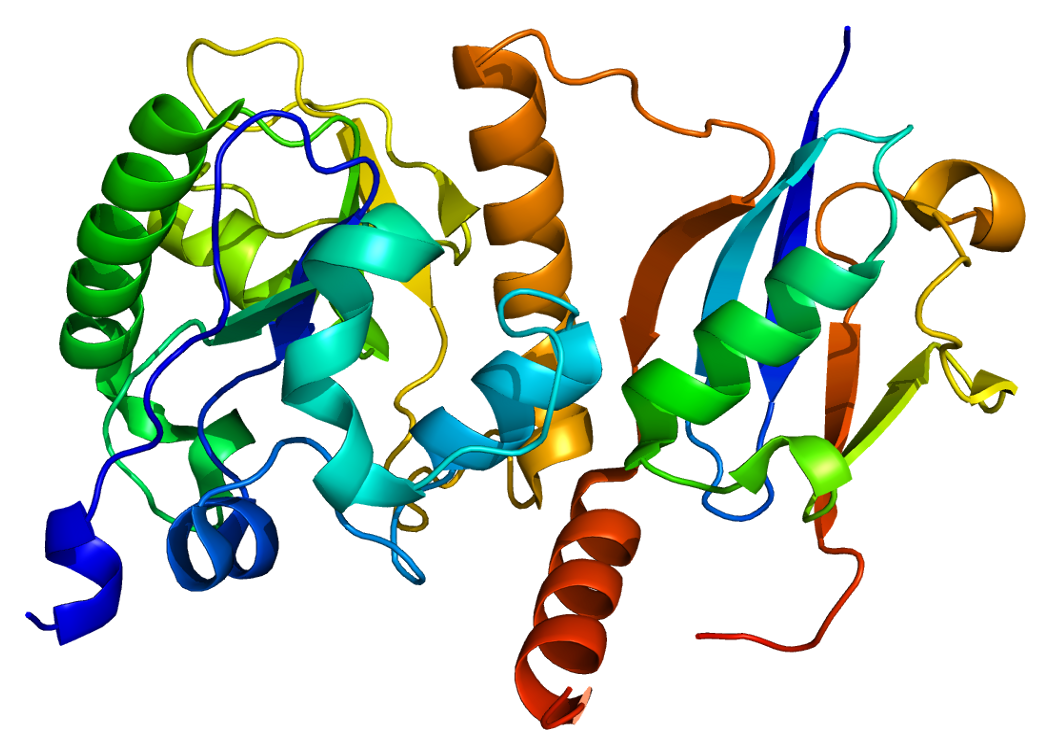

Identifiers
- Aliases: TDG, hThymine-DNA glycosylase, thymine DNA glycosylase
- External IDs: OMIM: 601423; MGI: 3645587; GeneCards: TDG
Available structures
PDB	Human UniProt search: PDBe RCSB
PDB	List of PDB id codes 1WYW, 2D07, 2RBA, 3UFJ, 3UO7, 3UOB, 4FNC, 4JGC, 4XEG, 4Z3A, 4Z47, 4Z7B, 4Z7Z, 5CYS
Enzyme activity
EC #	BRENDA	ExPASy	KEGG	MetaCyc
3.2.2.29	↗	↗	↗	↗

Gene location (Human)
Chr.	Chromosome 12 (human)
Band	12q23.3	Start	103,965,822 bp
Band	12q23.3	End	103,988,874 bp
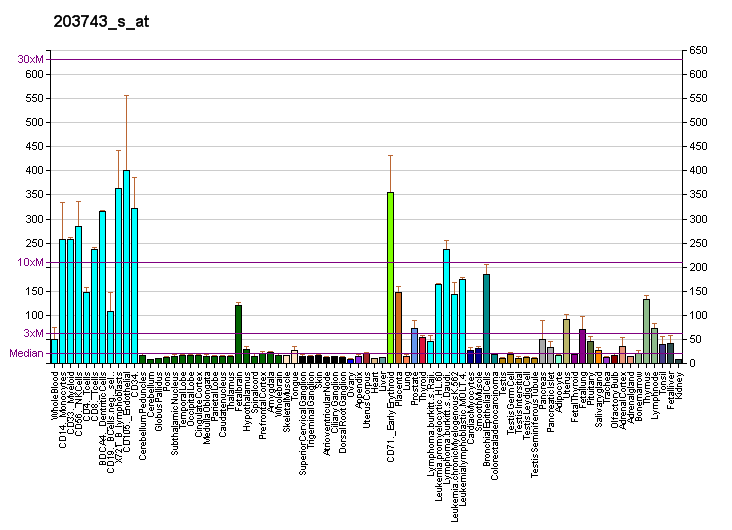
RNA expression pattern
Bgee	Human / Mouse (ortholog); Top expressed in: buccal mucosa cell; visceral pleura; tibia; endothelial cell; epithelium of nasopharynx; gingival epithelium; parietal pleura; amniotic fluid; germinal epithelium; hair follicle / n/a; More reference expression data
BioGPS	More reference expression data
Gene ontology
Molecular function	protein homodimerization activity; transcription coregulator activity; damaged DNA binding; protein binding; double-stranded DNA binding; hydrolase activity; protein kinase C binding; transcription factor binding; DNA N-glycosylase activity; mismatched DNA binding; protein domain specific binding; DNA binding; magnesium ion binding; uracil DNA N-glycosylase activity; ATP binding; pyrimidine-specific mismatch base pair DNA N-glycosylase activity; sodium ion binding; chloride ion binding; SUMO binding; protein self-association; G/U mismatch-specific uracil-DNA glycosylase activity
Cellular component	PML body; plasma membrane; nucleoplasm; nucleus
Biological process	regulation of transcription, DNA-templated; embryo development; negative regulation of chromatin binding; oxidative DNA demethylation; negative regulation of transcription by RNA polymerase II; negative regulation of protein binding; transcription, DNA-templated; cellular response to DNA damage stimulus; depyrimidination; DNA demethylation; base-excision repair; DNA repair; DNA mismatch repair; regulation of gene expression, epigenetic; base-excision repair, AP site formation; regulation of DNA N-glycosylase activity; chromatin organization; regulation of embryonic development
Sources:Amigo / QuickGO
Orthologs
Databases	NCBI: entry; OMA: entry
Species	Human	Mouse
Entrez	6996	545124
Ensembl	ENSG00000139372	n/a
UniProt	Q13569	n/a
RefSeq (mRNA)	NM_001008411; NM_003211; NM_001363612	XM_006521630
RefSeq (protein)	NP_003202; NP_001350541	n/a
Location (UCSC)	Chr 12: 103.97 – 103.99 Mb	n/a
PubMed search
- Wikidata
View/Edit Human	View/Edit Mouse

G/T mismatch-specific thymine DNA glycosylase is an enzyme that in humans is encoded by the TDG gene. Several bacterial proteins have strong sequence homology with this protein.

== Function ==
The protein encoded by this gene belongs to the TDG/mug DNA glycosylase family. Thymine-DNA glycosylase (TDG) removes thymine moieties from G/T mismatches by hydrolyzing the carbon-nitrogen bond between the sugar-phosphate backbone of DNA and the mispaired thymine. With lower activity, this enzyme also removes thymine from C/T and T/T mispairings. TDG can also remove uracil and 5-bromouracil from mispairings with guanine. TDG knockout mouse models showed no increase in mispairing frequency suggesting that other enzymes, like the functional homologue MBD4, may provide functional redundancy. This gene may have a pseudogene in the p arm of chromosome 12.

Additionally, in 2011, the human thymine DNA glycosylase (hTDG) was reported to efficiently excise 5-formylcytosine (5fC) and 5-carboxylcytosine (5caC), the key oxidation products of 5-methylcytosine in genomic DNA. Later on, the crystal structure of the hTDG catalytic domain in complex with duplex DNA containing 5caC was published, which supports the role of TDG in mammalian 5-methylcytosine demethylation.

== Interactions ==
Thymine-DNA glycosylase has been shown to interact with:

- CREB-binding protein,
- Estrogen receptor alpha,
- Promyelocytic leukemia protein,
- SUMO3, and
- Small ubiquitin-related modifier 1.

== Interactive pathway map ==
Click on genes, proteins and metabolites below to link to respective articles. (Note: The interactive pathway map can be edited at WikiPathways: "FluoropyrimidineActivity_WP1601".)

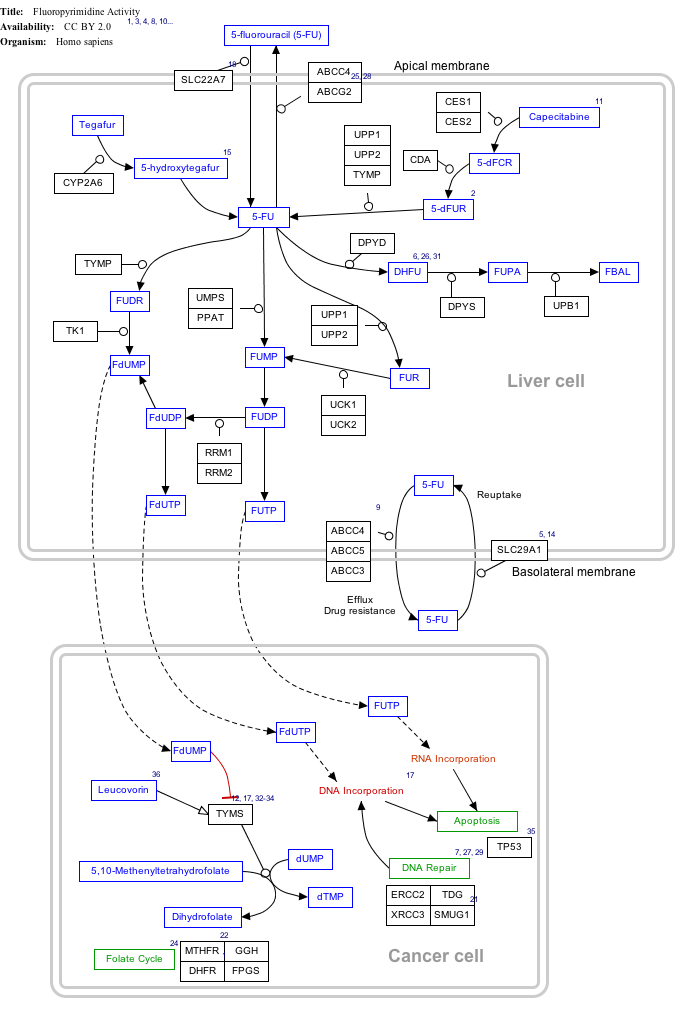

Fluorouracil (5-FU) Activity edit

== See also ==
- DNA-deoxyinosine glycosylase
- SMUG1
- Uracil-DNA glycosylase
- MBD4
