= Tap =

Tap(s), TAP(S) or tapped may refer to:

== Arts and entertainment ==
=== Film ===
- Tap (film), a 1989 American dance drama film
- Taps (film), a 1981 American drama film
- Taps (2006 film), a short film
- Tapped (film), a 2009 documentary

=== Gaming ===
- Tap (gaming), a mechanic in Magic: The Gathering and other card games where a card is rotated
- Tapping, creating an artificial lag, a method of cheating in online games
- TapTap, video game distribution platform

=== Music and dancing ===
- Tap dance, a type of dance using the sounds of tap shoes striking the floor
- Tapping, a guitar playing technique
- "Taps" (bugle call), a U.S. armed forces bugle call
- Tap: Book of Angels Volume 20, a 2013 album by Pat Metheny composed by John Zorn
- Tap (EP), a 2024 extended play by Taeyong

=== Publications ===
- Tap!, a defunct magazine for owners of Apple's iOS devices
- The American Prospect, a liberal policy magazine based in Washington, D.C.
- TAP (magazine), a Youth International Party phreaking/hacking magazine
- "TAP" (novelette), by Greg Egan, 1995

== Businesses and organisations ==
- The Atlantic Paranormal Society (TAPS), an organization that investigates reported paranormal activity
- Molson Coors Brewing Company, NYSE symbol TAP
- Secret Polish Army, Tajna Armia Polska, a Polish resistance movement in World War II
- Taiwanese American Professionals (TAP), an American non-profit network for young Taiwanese-American professionals
- TAP Air Portugal, Portugal's flag carrier airline
- TAP Digital Media Ventures Corporation, a Philippine media and entertainment company
- TAP Pharmaceuticals, a joint venture
- TAP Boyz (The Arabian Posse), a Chicago street gang
- TAPS Division, Informatics General, an American computer software company
- Tasmanians Against the Pulpmill, a group opposing the Bell Bay Pulp Mill
- Tony Ayres Production, an Australian film production company belonging to Tony Ayres
- Trafficking and Prostitution Services (TAPS), an organisation for sexual trafficking victims
- Trans-Adriatic Pipeline (TAP), a natural gas Transport System Operator (pipeline)
- Tragedy Assistance Program for Survivors (TAPS), a U.S. non-profit organization
- Tunis Afrique Presse, a Tunisian news agency

== Medicine ==
Conditions:

- Twin anemia-polycythemia sequence

Procedures involving fluid removal through a needle:

- Lumbar puncture, also known as a spinal tap
- Paracentesis, also known as an abdominal tap
- Thoracentesis / thoracocentesis, also known as a pleural tap

== People ==
- Tap Canutt (1932–2014), American stunt performer and actor
- Tap Jones (1914–2007), British Royal Air Force air marshal
- Taps Mugadza (born 1988), Zimbabwean singer known by the mononym Taps
- Taps Miller (1915–?), American entertainer

== Places ==
- Tap, Azerbaijan
- Táp, Hungary
- Taps, the German name of Tapa, Estonia

== Science and technology ==
=== Engineering ===
- Tap (valve), a device for controlling the release of a liquid or gas, e.g. a water faucet
  - Beer tap
- Tap (transformer), an intermediate point on the winding of an electrical transformer
- Tap and die, tools to create screw threads

=== Computing and communications ===
- Tap (signal processing), a delayed impulse response
- Network tap (terminal access point), a system that monitors events on a local network
- Telephone tap, a device that monitors phone conversations
- Vampire tap, a method for attaching computer nodes to a network cable
- Telelocator Alphanumeric Protocol, a protocol for sending messages to a cellular or pager service
- Test Anything Protocol, a communication protocol
- Topfield Application Program, a software application for digital TV
- Tap, a pointing device gesture
- Test access port in JTAG standard
- Amazon Tap, a portable version of the Amazon Echo voice assistant
- TUN/TAP, virtual network kernel interfaces
- .TAP files, tape images from Commodore 8-bit computers; see Commodore 64 disk / tape emulation
- Transferred Account Procedure data files, see Roaming
- Task-based asynchronous pattern, Microsoft's term for the Async/await pattern in C#

=== Science ===
- Tap consonant, a type of phonetic sound
- TAPS (buffer), a chemical compound commonly used to make buffer solutions
- TET-assisted pyridine borane sequencing (TAPS), laboratory technique for DNA methylation profiling
- Tandem affinity purification (TAP), a technique for studying protein interactions
- Timor–Alor–Pantar languages
- Transporter associated with antigen processing (TAP), a protein complex
- 2,4,6-triaminopyrimidine (TAP), a candidate primordial genetic base under the RNA world hypothesis
- Twin anemia-polycythemia sequence (TAPS), a form of chronic inter-twin transfusion

== Transportation ==
- Trans Adriatic Pipeline (TAP), a gas pipeline via Greece, Albania and Italy
- Trans-Alaska Pipeline System (TAPS), a petroleum pipeline across Alaska, United States
- TAP card, an electronic ticketing payment method in Los Angeles County, California, United States
- Tapachula International Airport, Chiapas, Mexico, IATA airport code TAP
- Tai Po Market station, Hong Kong, MTR station code TAP
- Taplow railway station, Buckinghamshire, England, National Rail station code TAP

== Other uses ==
- Tap code, a simple way to encode text messages on a letter-by-letter basis
- Tap, a method of contactless payment
- Tarapur Atomic Power Station (TAPS), Tarapur, Palghar, India
- Three Apogee orbit (TAP)
- Trans Adriatic Pipeline (TAP), a gas pipeline
- Trans-Alaska Pipeline System (TAPS), a crude-oil pipeline
- Tuition Assistance Program, New York State, U.S.
- Tap, or Tab (cuneiform), a cuneiform sign
- Tap room, in a British bar
- Taps (bugle call)

== See also ==
- Tapping (disambiguation)
- Tap out (disambiguation)
- Tap tap (disambiguation)
- Tapa (disambiguation)
