= 2010 Nagorno-Karabakh clashes =

Military conflict in Azerbaijan

- Part of the Nagorno-Karabakh conflict
Date	18 February 2010
Location	Goranboy Rayon, Tartar Rayon and Agdam Rayon, Azerbaijan

Belligerents
Armenia	Azerbaijan

Strength
Unknown	Unknown

Casualties and losses
None	3 killed, 1 wounded

The 2010 Nagorno-Karabakh clashes were a series of exchanges of gunfire that took place on February 18 on the line of contact dividing Azerbaijani and the Karabakh Armenian military forces. Azerbaijan accused the Armenian forces of firing on the Azerbaijani positions near Tap Qaraqoyunlu, Qızıloba, Qapanlı, Yusifcanlı and Cavahirli villages, as well as in uplands of Agdam Rayon with small arms fire including snipers. As a result, three Azerbaijani soldiers were killed and one wounded.

The engagement became the second deadliest ceasefire violation since 1994, after the 2008 Mardakert clashes.

== Incidents ==
The incidents embraced two regions in Nagorno-Karabakh (Tartar Rayon, Agdam Rayon) and one region out of it (Goranboy Rayon). Azerbaijani sources claim that on 13:00 local time the Karabakh Armenian military fired from Talysh towards the Azerbaijani positions in Tap Qaraqoyunlu. Accordingly, at 15:00 Armenian troops allegedly opened fire from Agdam Rayon, killing one Azeri soldier. After some time the shooting achieved a large-scale character and continued until evening. According to the Azerbaijani side, Karabakh Armenian troops withdrew with losses.

== Casualties ==
Following the incidents the Azerbaijani Defense Ministry announced the names of those killed: Private Sahil Mammadov (born 10 April 1991, called up by Shaki Commissariat in April, 2009), Corporal Royal Farajov (born 8 March 1991, called up in April, 2009), Private Davud Rustamov (born 22 July 1991, called up in October, 2009). Private Elvin Adigozalov (born 10 December 1990, called up in January, 2009) was wounded.

Although the Azerbaijani Ministry of Defense estimated Armenian casualties to be "not less than ours", Armenian military spokesman Senor Hasratian denied that the Armenian side had sustained any casualties.

== International reaction ==
- Iran On February 19 Iranian ambassador in Armenia Seyed Ali Saghaeyan said at a press conference in Yerevan: "Iran shares a common border with Karabakh, and therefore we surely have our own considerations and views about the composition of a peacekeeping force that might be deployed in the conflict zone". Saghaeyan, however, did not clarify what he meant by Iran and Karabakh share "a common border."
