= Second Impact =

Second Impact can refer to:

- Second impact (safety), the impact suffered by a vehicle occupant between his body and whatever stops it from moving inside the vehicle in a crash
- Second-impact syndrome, a rare, deadly condition in which the brain swells as the result of a concussion received before symptoms from another concussion have gone away
- Street Fighter III: 2nd Impact - Giant Attack, a version of Street Fighter III.
- The Second Impact, a cataclysmic event in the anime Neon Genesis Evangelion
