= The Blue Feet Foundation =

US non-profit organization

- Founded: 2016
- Type: Nonprofit organization
- Location: Arlington, Massachusetts, U.S.
- Website: bluefeetfoundation.com

The Blue Feet Foundation is a non-profit organization based in Arlington, Massachusetts, that raises money to support research and the protection of the blue-footed booby in the Galapagos Islands. The population of the blue-footed booby in the Galapagos has fallen by 60% since the 1960s.

== Background ==
The Blue Feet Foundation was founded by Will and Matthew Gladstone after studying birds at the Fessenden School in Newton, Massachusetts, US. The primary source of revenue is the selling of blue socks that match the color of the feet of the blue-footed booby.
