= Ben Kurland =

American actor and entrepreneur (born 1984)

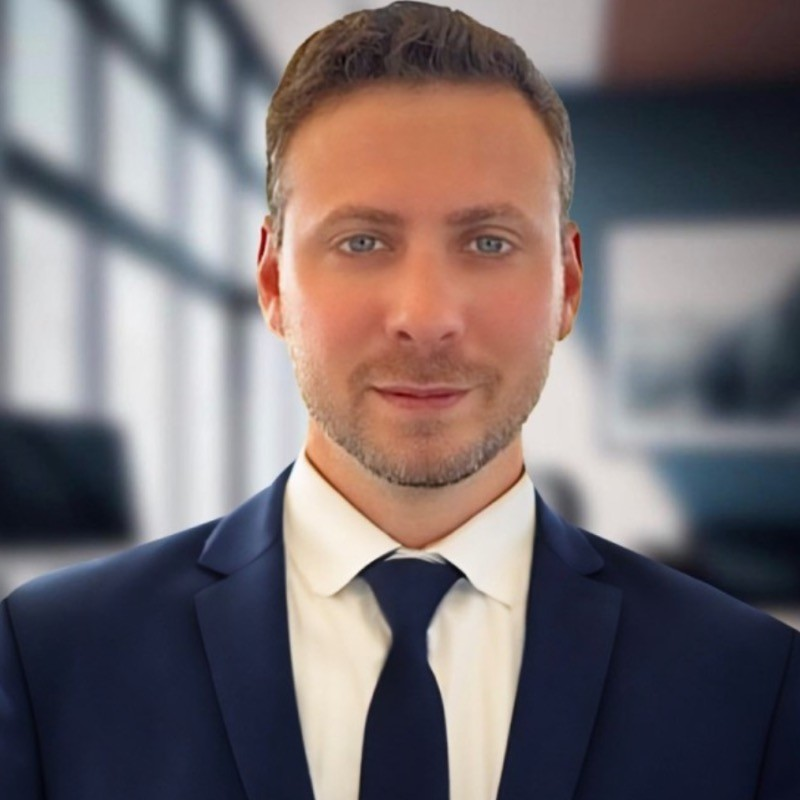
- Born: Benjamin David Kurland; May 1, 1984 (age 42); Newton, Massachusetts, U.S.
- Education: Emerson CollegeUniversity of Southern California (BFA)
- Occupations: Actor, entrepreneur, producer
- Years active: 2006–present
- Relatives: Jaime Ray Newman (cousin)

Benjamin David Kurland (born May 1, 1984) is an American actor and entrepreneur, best known for his role in the Academy Award-winning film ‘’The Artist’’.

== Early life and education ==
Kurland was born in Newton, Massachusetts, and raised in Dedham and Newton, Massachusetts. He began acting at age 11, performing in local theater productions, and attended the Walnut Hill School during summers. At The Fessenden School, he developed his acting skills further, which led to performances in over a dozen plays before high school. At Choate Rosemary Hall, he earned the opportunity to perform in ‘’The Zoo Story’’ under the mentorship of Edward Albee, which garnered national media attention."Young Actor Thrives Under Albee's Direction". The New York Times. March 1, 2002.

Kurland attended Emerson College and later transferred to the University of Southern California’s School of Theatre, where he completed his degree in 2006.

== Career ==
=== Acting ===
Kurland began his acting career in independent films, gaining recognition for his performance in ‘’Taps’’, which won first prize at the Rhode Island International Film Festival. In 2011, he appeared in the critically acclaimed ‘’The Artist’’, delivering a small yet important performance alongside stars John Goodman, James Cromwell, and Penelope Ann Miller.

Kurland later starred in the horror-comedy ‘‘Deadly Retreat’’ opposite Jonathan Bennett. He also appeared in ‘‘Mindless’’, a psychological thriller from producer Michael Biehn

== Awards and nominations ==
| Year | Award | Category | Work | Result |
|---|---|---|---|---|
| 2011 | Screen Actors Guild Award | Outstanding Performance by a Cast in a Motion Picture | ‘’The Artist’’ | Nominated |
| 2012 | StageSceneLA Awards | Outstanding Performance by a Lead Actor - Comedy | Guided Consideration | Won |
