= Nils Bohlin =

Swedish inventor

- Born: 17 July 1920; Härnösand, Sweden
- Died: 21 September 2002 (aged 82); Ramfall, Ydre Municipality Sweden
- Resting place: Torpa Church, Ramfall, Sweden
- Occupation: Inventor
- Employer(s): Saab, Volvo
- Known for: Safety Belt
- Spouse: Maj-Britt Bohlin

Nils Ivar Bohlin (17 July 1920 – 21 September 2002) was a Swedish mechanical engineer and inventor who invented the three-point safety belt while working at Volvo.

== Biography ==
Born in Härnösand, Sweden, Bohlin received a diploma in mechanical engineering from Härnösand Läroverk in 1939. In 1942 he started working for the aircraft maker Saab as an aircraft designer and helped develop ejection seats. In 1958 he joined Volvo as a safety engineer. He is credited with the invention of the modern three-point safety belt, now a standard safety feature in all cars.

Bohlin worked on the seat belt for about a year, using skills in developing ejection seats for SAAB; he concentrated on keeping the driver safe in a car accident. After testing the three-point safety belt, he introduced his invention to the Volvo company in 1959 and received his first patent (number 3,043,625). Ten years later, he led the Central Research and Development Department for Volvo in 1969.

In 1974, he was awarded the Ralph Isbrandt Automotive Safety Engineering Award, and in 1989 he was inducted into the Hall of Fame for Safety and Health. He received a gold medal from Royal Swedish Academy of Engineering Sciences in 1995 and in 1999, was inducted into the Automotive Hall of Fame. He retired from Volvo as Senior Engineer in 1985 and was posthumously inducted into the National Inventors Hall of Fame.

Bohlin died on 21 September 2002 at the age of 82, of a heart attack and was buried at Torpa Church in Ramfall, Ydre Municipality, Sweden.

== Personal life ==
During his adult life, he was married to Maj-Britt Bohlin. He was stepfather to Maj-Britt's two sons and then had two children together and thirteen grandchildren.

== Effects on history ==
The three-point seat belt changed the world by preventing injuries during a car crash. The US National Highway Traffic Safety Administration says that the seat belt saves about 15,000 lives per year in the US.

In addition to designing an effective three-point belt, Bohlin demonstrated its effectiveness in a study of 28,000 accidents in Sweden, and presented a paper at the 11th Stapp Car Crash Convention. Unbelted occupants sustained fatal injuries throughout the whole speed scale, whereas no belted occupants were fatally injured at accident speeds below 60 mph. No belted occupant was fatally injured if the passenger compartment remained intact. The study resulted in the U.S. Department of Transportation requiring three-point seat belts in American cars. In 1968, the new seat belt design was made free for the public to use. In most industrial countries, occupants are required by law to use seat belts.

== Sources ==
- Dredge, Richard. Volvo. Haynes Publishing: Sparkford, UK, November 2003
