= Winchell McKendree Craig =

American neurosurgeon (1892–1960)

Winchell McKendree Craig (April 27, 1892 – February 12, 1960) was an American neurosurgeon associated with the Mayo Clinic and the University of Minnesota.

Craig succeeded Alfred Washington Adson as chief of neurological surgery at the Mayo Clinic in 1946 and served until 1955. A longtime officer in the United States Navy Reserve, Craig was called to active duty during World War II and became a leading organizer of neurosurgical services for the Navy, ultimately attaining the rank of rear admiral.

== Early life and education ==
Born in Washington Court House, Ohio, one of six children of Eliza Orlena Pine Craig and Thomas Henry Craig, his family operated a large department store there. Craig attended the public schools and spent a year at Culver Military Academy in 1911 before entering Ohio Wesleyan University, where he received a B.A. in 1915, followed by an M.D. from the Johns Hopkins School of Medicine in 1919. Craig joined the United States Navy Reserve shortly after graduating from Johns Hopkins in 1919 and remained active in the reserve during the period between the world wars.

After interning at St. Agnes Hospital in Baltimore, Craig was appointed a fellow in general surgery at the Mayo Clinic in Rochester, Minnesota, where he remained for the rest of his active medical career. In 1924, Craig sought to specialize in neurosurgery, apparently at the encouragement of Alfred Adson, chief of the neurological surgery service. Following additional training in the neurological sciences, particularly medical neurology, Craig became the second permanent staff member of Mayo's Section of Neurological Surgery.

== Medical and teaching career ==
Craig was appointed an instructor in neurological surgery at the University of Minnesota through the Mayo Foundation Graduate School in 1927, and received an M.S. degree in 1930. He subsequently became an associate professor and, in 1937, a full professor. Among his students was C. Hunter Shelden, who later became a leading advocate of equipping automobiles with seat belts and other safety measures.

Craig was active in the professional organizations through which neurosurgery developed as a distinct medical specialty. In particular, from 1948 to 1949, he served as president of the Harvey Cushing Society, later renamed the American Association of Neurological Surgeons.

== World War II service ==
Following the attack on Pearl Harbor in December 1941, Craig was mobilized for active duty. He was among a group of Mayo Clinic specialists assigned to Naval Hospital Corona in California, where the first Mayo unit served in from 1941 to 1942. Craig helped establish the hospital's medical services, and established the first neurosurgical center specifically organized for wounded Navy and United States Marine Corps personnel.

Craig was subsequently assigned to tour naval installations and lecture newly arriving medical officers on naval medical practice. One such assignment brought him to Washington, D.C., and the National Naval Medical Center in Bethesda, Maryland, where he became chief of the neurosurgical division and then chief of surgery. By November 1943, Craig held the rank of captain and was serving as chief of surgery at Bethesda while on military leave from his professorship at the University of Minnesota. While at Bethesda, Craig supervised and trained other neurosurgeons; Shelden, who had received part of his earlier surgical training under Craig, volunteered for Navy service and reported to Bethesda in September 1942 to work under his direction.

Craig eventually attained the rank of rear admiral. He was the first physician serving in the Navy Reserve to be promoted to that rank. His wartime service placed him in a leading role in the organization and development of neurosurgical care within the Navy.

== Post-war career and later life ==
After the war, Craig returned to the Mayo Clinic. Adson retired in 1946, and Craig succeeded him as chief of the Section of Neurological Surgery. He remained chief until April 1, 1955, when he became senior consultant, until his retirement from active medical practice on July 1, 1957.

Craig thereafter became director of civilian defense for the city of Rochester. In early 1959, he was appointed a field representative of the American Medical Association's Council on Medical Education and Hospitals, and subsequently went to Washington, D.C., where he served on the staff of Arthur Flemming, the Secretary of Health, Education, and Welfare. Craig continued in that position until becoming seriously ill around Christmas 1959.

== Personal life and death ==
Craig married Jean Katherine Fitzgerald Craig, with whom he had four children.

Craig died at St. Mary's Hospital in Rochester on February 12, 1960, at the age of 67, from a primary brain tumor arising from the third ventricle and hypothalamus, histologically identified as a reticulum-cell sarcoma.
