= Tap out =

Tap out or Tapout can refer to:

- Tap out, submission in combat sport
- Tapout (clothing brand)
- Tapout (TV series)
- UFC: Tapout, a video game
- "Tapout" (song), a 2013 song by Rich Gang
- "Tap Out", a 2011 song by Keke Wyatt from the album Unbelievable
- "Tap Out", song by Jay Rock ft. Jeremih from the album Redemption

== See also ==
- Tap (disambiguation)
- Tape-out
