= Second impact (safety) =

Collision of vehicle and occupant in a crash

The second impact, also known as second collision and human collision, is the impact suffered between a vehicle occupant and the vehicle during a collision. The first impact is the impact between the vehicle and another object. There is also a third impact between the internal organs and the frame of the body.

The term was coined in the 1950s by Sergeant Elmer Paul of the Indiana State Police. Paul convinced Indiana authorities to investigate the mechanics of highway injuries, and worked with safety pioneer Hugh DeHaven.

The effects of the second impact are reduced by the use of seat belts, airbags, interior vehicle padding and removing of aggressive structures.
