= Tap Tap =

Tap tap is a type of taxicab.

Tap Tap may also refer to:

- Tap Tap (series), a series of video games for the iPhone
  - Tap Tap Revenge, the first game in the series
- Tap Tap (band), a British indie band
- TapTap, a Chinese mobile app store

== See also ==
- Tap (disambiguation)
