= Seat belt =

Vehicle safety device to protect against injury during collisions and sudden stop

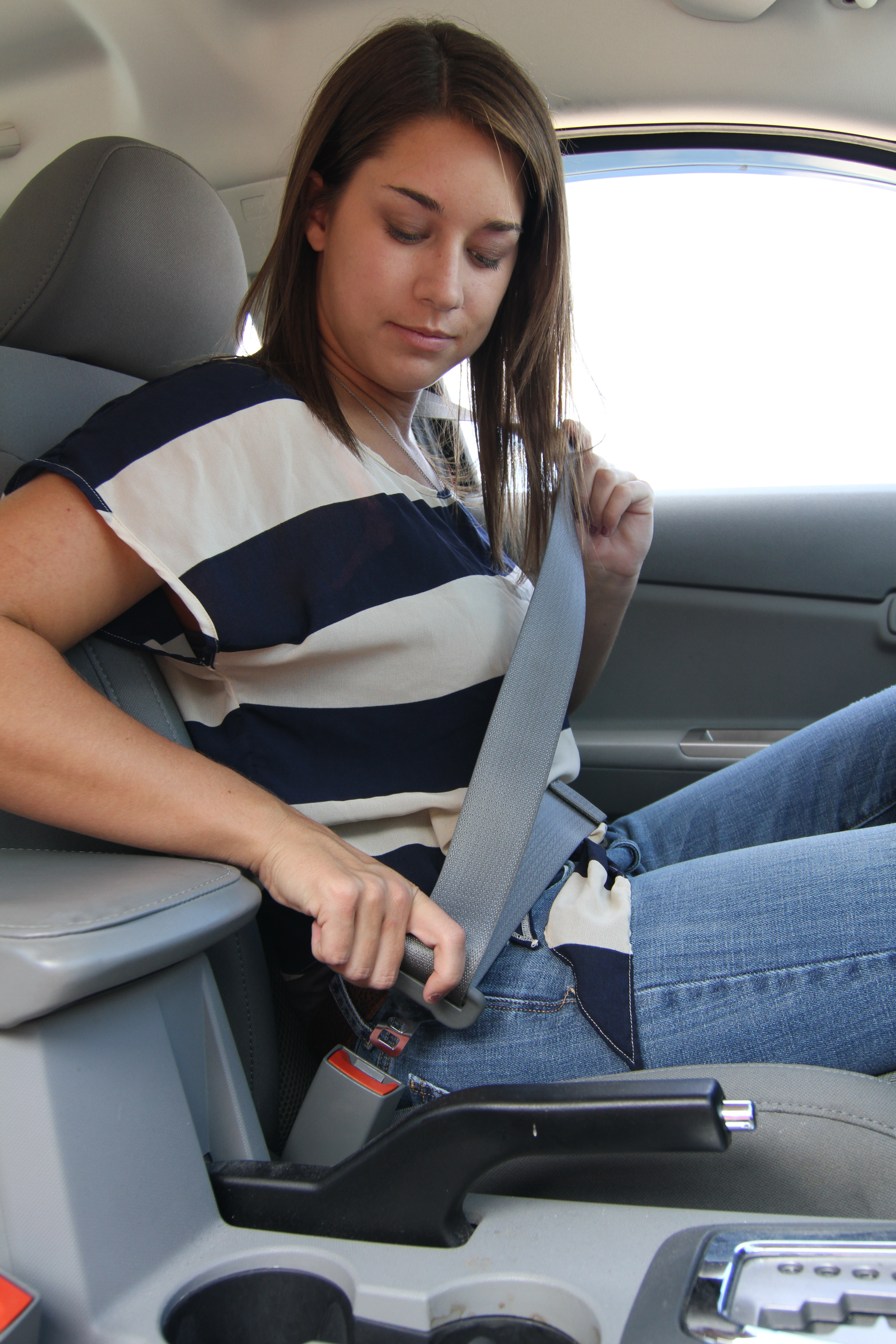
Buckling a three-point seat belt

A seat belt or seatbelt, also known as a safety belt, is a vehicle safety device designed to secure the driver or a passenger of a vehicle against harmful movement that may result during a collision or a sudden stop. A seat belt reduces the likelihood of death or serious injury in a traffic collision by reducing the force of secondary impacts with interior strike hazards, by keeping occupants positioned correctly for maximum effectiveness of the airbag (if equipped), and by preventing occupants being ejected from the vehicle in a crash or if the vehicle rolls over.

When in motion, the driver and passengers are traveling at the same speed as the vehicle. If the vehicle suddenly halts or crashes, the occupants continue at the same speed the vehicle was going before it stopped. A seat belt applies an opposing force to the driver and passengers to prevent them from falling out or making contact with the interior of the car (especially preventing contact with, or going through, the windshield). Seat belts are considered primary restraint systems (PRSs), because of their vital role in occupant safety.

== Effectiveness ==
Lives saved by seat belts and airbags in the United States, 1991–2001

Video produced by the LAPD stressing the importance of wearing seat belts in preventing death in automobile collisions

An analysis conducted in the United States in 1984 compared a variety of seat belt types alone and in combination with air bags. The range of fatality reduction for front seat passengers was broad, from 20% to 55%, as was the range of major injury, from 25% to 60%. More recently, the Centers for Disease Control and Prevention has summarized these data by stating "seat belts reduce serious crash-related injuries and deaths by about half." Most malfunctions are a result of there being too much slack in the seat belt at the time of the accident.

In case of vehicle rollover in a U.S. passenger car or SUV, from 1994 to 2004, wearing a seat belt reduced the risk of fatalities or incapacitating injuries and increased the probability of no injury:

- In case of vehicle rollover in a U.S. passenger car, there are 0.71% fatalities in 1994 and 0.87% in 2014 when user is restrained. There are 7% fatalities in 1994 and 13% in 2014 when the user is unrestrained.
- In case of vehicle rollover, there are 10% incapacitating injury in 1994 and 10% in 2014 when the user is restrained. There are 32% incapacitating injury in 1994 and 25% in 2014 when user is unrestrained.
- The probability of no injury is 45% in 1994 and 44% in 2014 when the user is restrained. There were 19% no injury in 1994 and 15% in 2014 when the user is unrestrained.

It has been suggested that although seat belt usage reduces the probability of death in any given accident, mandatory seat belt laws have little or no effect on the overall number of traffic fatalities because seat belt usage also disincentivizes safe driving behaviors, thereby increasing the total number of accidents. This idea, known as compensating-behavior theory, is not supported by the evidence.

== History ==
Seat belts were invented by English engineer George Cayley, to use on his glider, in the mid-19th century.

By 1928, all aircraft were required to have them.

Nash was the first American car manufacturer to offer seat belts as a factory option, in its 1949 models. They were installed in 40,000 cars, but buyers did not want them and requested that dealers remove them. The feature was "met with insurmountable sales resistance" and Nash reported that after one year "only 1,000 had been used" by customers.

Ford offered seat belts as an option in its 1956 models. Ford reported that, a few months into the new model year, 20% of buyers were ordering seat belts from the factory, with another 10% choosing dealer-installed belts.

In the early 1950s C. Hunter Shelden, a neurologist working at the Huntington Memorial Hospital in Pasadena, California, studied the high number of head injuries he saw due to auto accidents. Based on his study of the early seat belts whose primitive designs were implicated in these injuries and deaths, in a 1955 paper he proposed retractable seat belts, as well as recessed steering wheels, reinforced roofs, roll bars, and passive restraints such as air bags.

Glenn W. Sheren, of Mason, Michigan, submitted a patent application on March 31, 1955, for an automotive seat belt and was awarded U.S. patent 2,855,215 in 1958. This was a continuation of an earlier patent application that Sheren had filed on September 22, 1952.

The first modern three-point seat belt (the so-called CIR-Griswold restraint) commonly used in consumer vehicles was patented in 1955 U.S. patent 2,710,649 by the Americans Roger W. Griswold and Hugh DeHaven.

Saab introduced seat belts as standard equipment in 1958. After the Saab GT 750 was introduced at the New York Motor Show in 1958 with safety belts fitted as standard, the practice became commonplace.

Vattenfall, the Swedish national electric utility, did a study of all fatal, on-the-job accidents among their employees. The study revealed that the majority of fatalities occurred while the employees were on the road on company business. In response, two Vattenfall safety engineers, Bengt Odelgard and Per-Olof Weman, started to develop a seat belt. Their work was presented to Swedish manufacturer Volvo in the late 1950s, and set the standard for seat belts in Swedish cars. The three-point seat belt was developed to its modern form by Swedish inventor Nils Bohlin for Volvo, which introduced it in 1959 as standard equipment. In addition to designing an effective three-point belt, Bohlin demonstrated its effectiveness in a study of 28,000 accidents in Sweden. Unbelted occupants sustained fatal injuries throughout the whole speed scale, whereas none of the belted occupants was fatally injured at accident speeds below 60 mph. No belted occupant was fatally injured if the passenger compartment remained intact. Bohlin was granted U.S. patent 3,043,625 for the device.

In the U.S., automakers agreed to provide seat belt anchors beginning with the 1962 model year. That same model year, Wisconsin was the first state to mandate seat belt installation in all new cars. Subsequently, in 1966, Congress passed the National Traffic and Motor Vehicle Safety Act, requiring all automobiles to comply with certain safety standards.

The first compulsory seat belt law was put in place in 1970, in the state of Victoria, Australia, requiring their use by drivers and front-seat passengers. This legislation was enacted after trialing Hemco seat belts, designed by Desmond Hemphill (1926–2001), in the front seats of police vehicles, lowering the incidence of officer injury and death. Mandatory seat belt laws in the United States began to be introduced in the 1980s and faced opposition, with some consumers going to court to challenge the laws. Some cut seat belts out of their cars.

== Material ==
The 'belt' part of the typical seatbelt seen in vehicles worldwide is referred to as the 'webbing'. Modern seat belt webbing has a high tensile strength, about 3,000–6,000 lb (1,400–2,700 kg), to resist tearing at high loads such as during high-speed collisions or while restraining larger passengers.

While nylon was used in some early seat belts (and is still used for lap belts), it was replaced by 100% polyester due to its better UV resistance, lower extensibility and higher stiffness. Nylon was also prone to stretching much more than polyester, and was prone to wear and tear, with tiny abrasions drastically reducing tensile strength, causing a lack of reliability in one of the most important safety measures in a vehicle. Seat belts are commonly 46 or 48 mm wide with a 2/2 herringbone twill weaving pattern to maximize the thread density. Modern seatbelt weaves also feature snag-proof selvedges reinforced with strong polyester threads to prevent the wear and tear, while remaining flexible. The weave features about 300 warp threads for every 46mm wide webbing, leading to around 150 ends per inch of webbing.

Accident investigators often examine the webbing of a seatbelt to determine if an occupant of a vehicle was wearing their seatbelt during a collision. The material of the webbing may contain traces of the occupant's clothing. Certain materials such as nylons may become permanently affixed or melted onto the fabric as a result of heat produced by friction, whereas fiber-based clothing leaves no remains on modern webbing.

== Types ==
=== Two-point airplane seat belts ===
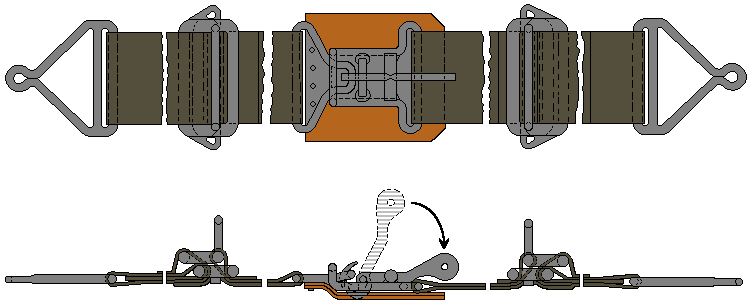
World War II U.S. military aircraft Safety Belt, U.S. Patent 2,105,480, note lift lever buckle

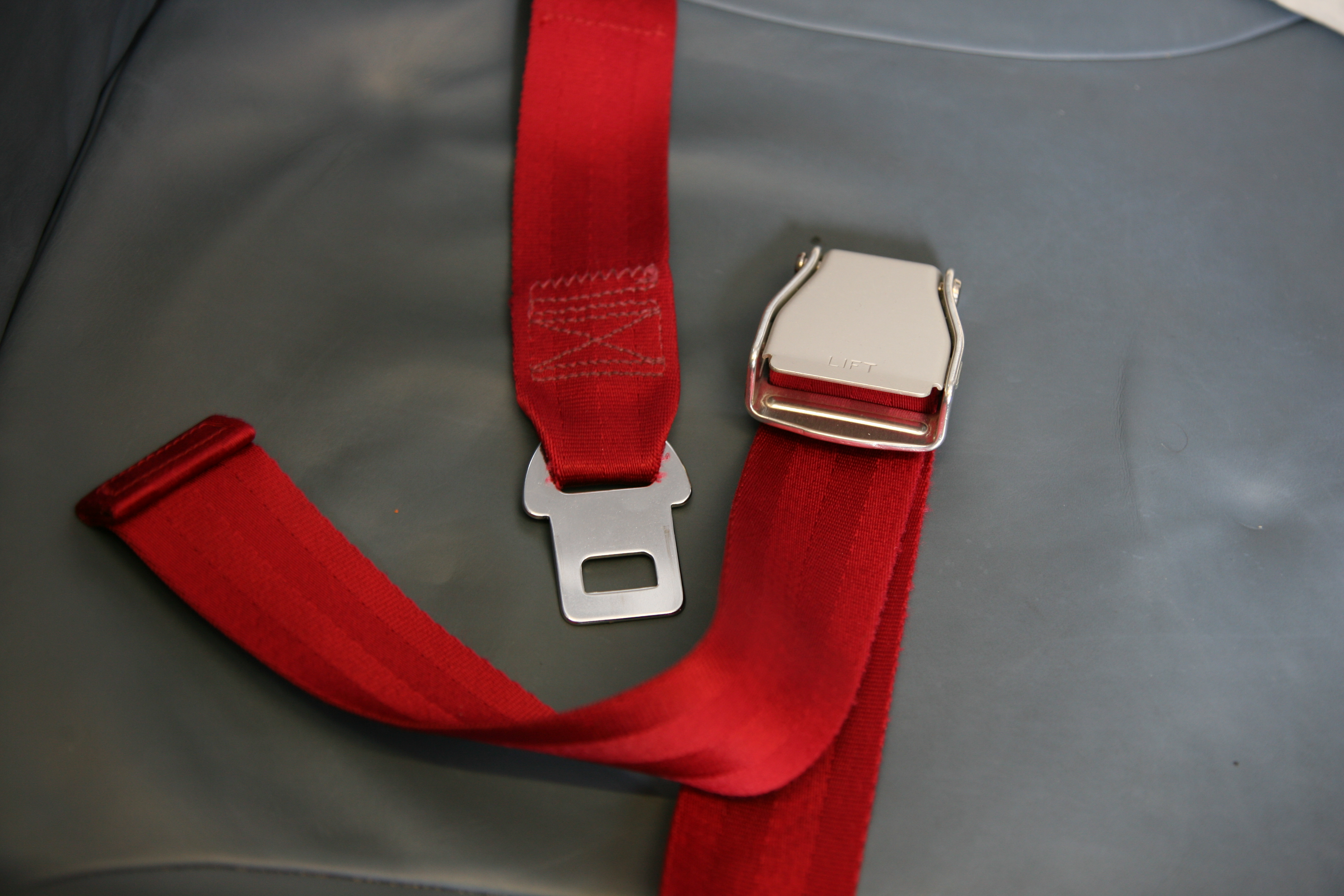
"2-point" belt in an airplane

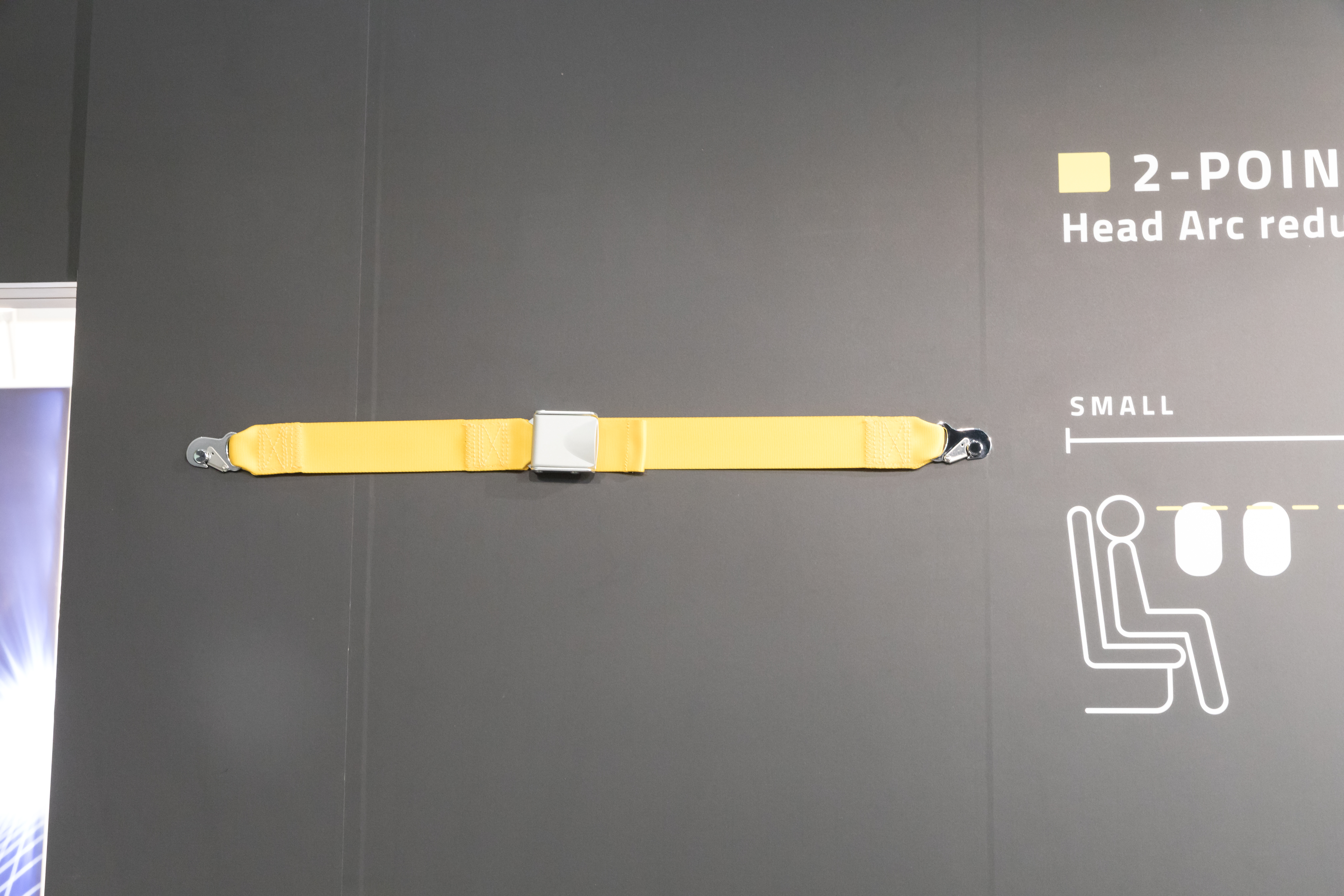
Airplane ("2-point") belt on display

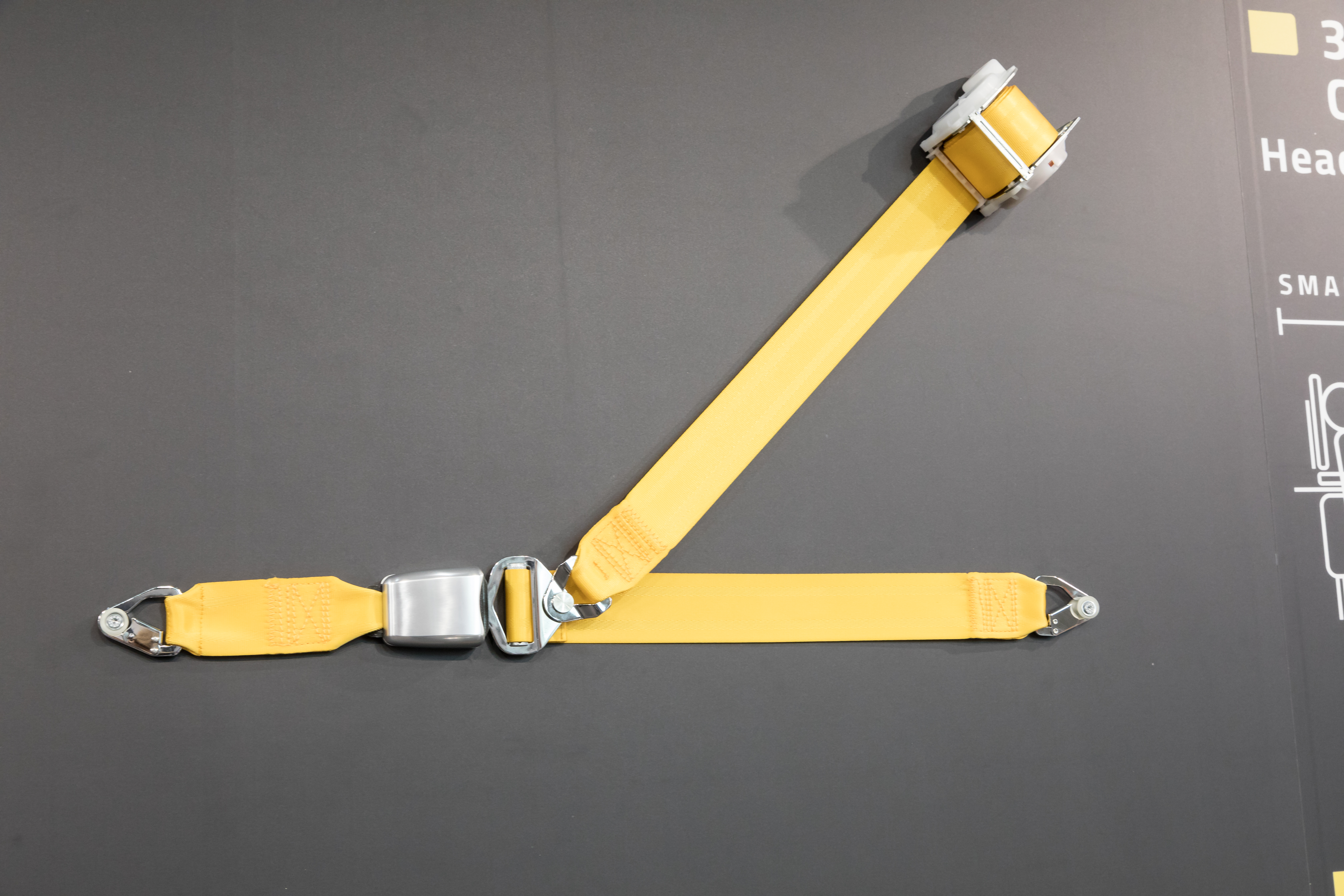
Airplane ("3-point") belt on display

An airplane seat belt is designed to protect from up and down movement and to keep passengers in their seats during turbulence or collisions on the runway. A simple strap was first used March 12, 1910, by pilot Benjamin Foulois, a pioneering aviator with the Aeronautical Division, U.S. Signal Corps, so he might remain at the controls during turbulence.

While lap belts are exceedingly rare to spot in modern cars, they are the standard in commercial airliners. The lift-lever style of commercial aircraft buckles allows for the seatbelt to be easily clasped and unclasped, accessible quickly in case of an emergency where a passenger must evacuate, and fulfills the minimum safety requirements provided by the FAA while remaining low-cost to produce. Furthermore, in case of any collision, a passenger in economy class has only around 9 inches for their head to travel forward, meaning restraining the torso and head is relatively unnecessary as the head has little room to accelerate before collision.

=== Two-point land seat belts ===
A two-point belt attaches at its two endpoints, land vehicles move typically in a forward or backward or sideways motion, because they generally stay on the ground, and need a shoulder belt. The Irvin Air Chute Company made the seat belt for use by professional race car driver Barney Oldfield when his team decided the daredevil should have a "safety harness" for the 1923 Indianapolis 500.

=== Lap belt ===
A lap belt is a strap that goes over the waist. This was the most common type of belt prior to legislation requiring three-point belts and is found in older cars. Coaches are equipped with lap belts (although many newer coaches have three-point belts), as are passenger aircraft seats. Recreational railbikes in the United States are also fitted with this belt.

University of Minnesota professor James J. "Crash" Ryan was the inventor of, and held the patent for, the automatic retractable lap safety belt. Ralph Nader cited Ryan's work in Unsafe at Any Speed and, following hearings led by Senator Abraham Ribicoff, President Lyndon Johnson signed two bills in 1966 requiring safety belts in all passenger vehicles starting in 1968.

Until the 1980s, three-point belts were commonly available only in the front outboard seats of cars; the back seats were often only fitted with lap belts. Evidence of the potential of lap belts to cause separation of the lumbar vertebrae and the sometimes-associated paralysis, or "seat belt syndrome" led to the progressive revision of passenger safety regulations in nearly all developed countries to require three-point belts, first in all outboard seating positions, and eventually in all seating positions in passenger vehicles. Since September 1, 2007, all new cars sold in the U.S. require a lap and shoulder belt in the center rear seat. In addition to regulatory changes, "seat belt syndrome" has led to a liability for vehicle manufacturers. One Los Angeles case resulted in a $45 million jury verdict against Ford; the resulting $30 million judgment (after deductions for another defendant who settled prior to trial) was affirmed on appeal in 2006.

=== Shoulder harness ===
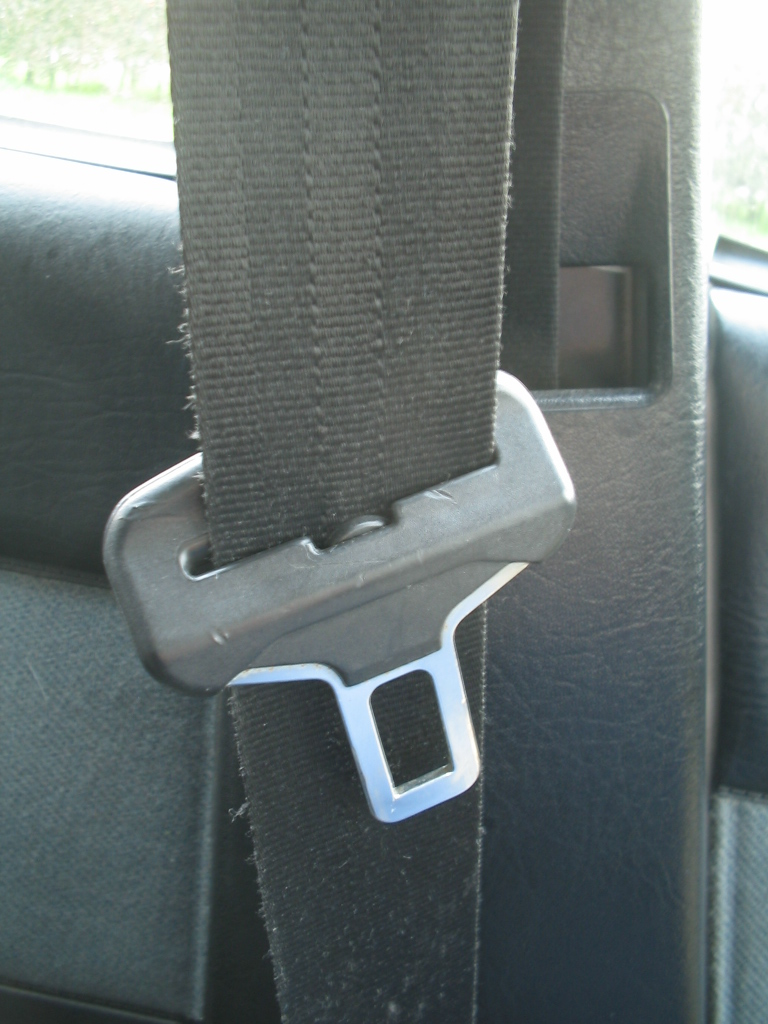
A seat belt and tongue

A "sash" or shoulder harness is a strap that goes diagonally over the vehicle occupant's outboard shoulder and is buckled inboard of their lap. The shoulder harness may attach to the lap belt tongue, or it may have a tongue and buckle completely separate from those of the lap belt. Shoulder harnesses of this separate or semi-separate type were installed in conjunction with lap belts in the outboard front seating positions of many vehicles in the North American market starting at the inception of the shoulder belt requirement of the U.S. National Highway Traffic Safety Administration's (NHTSA) Federal Motor Vehicle Safety Standard 208 on January 1, 1968. However, if the shoulder strap is used without the lap belt, the vehicle occupant is likely to "submarine", or slide forward in the seat and out from under the belt, in a frontal collision. In the mid-1970s, three-point belt systems such as Chrysler's "Uni-Belt" began to supplant the separate lap and shoulder belts in American-made cars, though such three-point belts had already been supplied in European vehicles such as Volvo, Mercedes-Benz, and Saab for some years.

=== Three-point ===
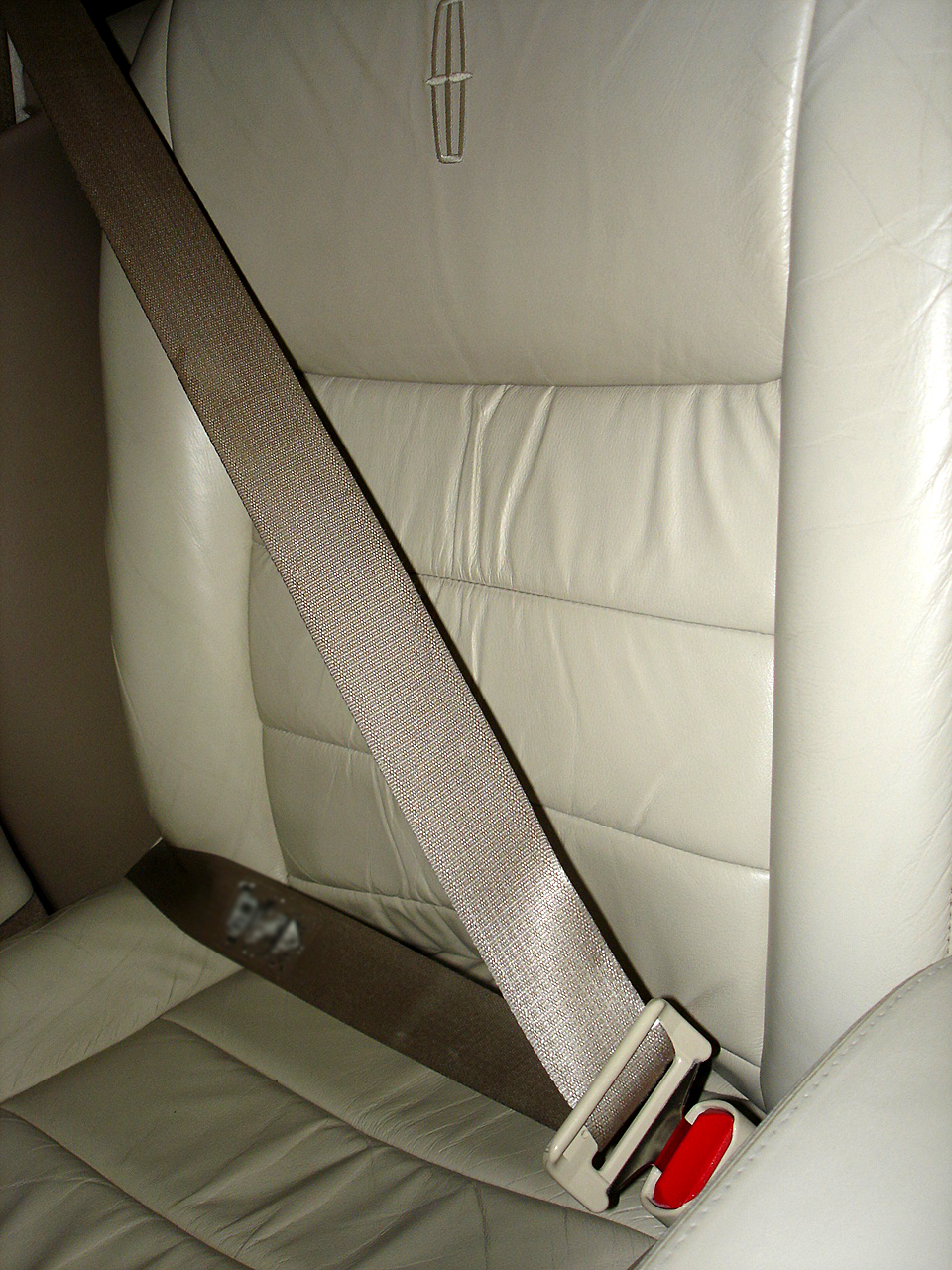
A three-point seat belt

A three-point belt is a Y-shaped arrangement, similar to the separate lap and sash belts, but unified. Like the separate lap-and-sash belt, in a collision, the three-point belt spreads out the energy of the moving body over the chest, pelvis, and shoulders. Volvo introduced the first production three-point belt in 1959. The first car with a three-point belt was a Volvo PV 544 that was delivered to a dealer in Kristianstad on August 13, 1959. The first car model to have the three-point seat belt as a standard item was the 1959 Volvo 122, first outfitted with a two-point belt at initial delivery in 1958, replaced with the three-point seat belt the following year. The three-point belt was developed by Nils Bohlin, who had earlier also worked on ejection seats at Saab. Volvo then made the new seat belt design patent open in the interest of safety and made it available to other car manufacturers for free.

==== Belt-in-Seat ====
The Belt-in-Seat (BIS) is a three-point harness with the shoulder belt attached to the seat itself, rather than to the vehicle structure. The first car using this system was the Range Rover Classic, which offered BIS as standard on the front seats from 1970. Some cars, like the Renault Vel Satis, use this system for the front seats. A General Motors assessment concluded seat-mounted three-point belts offer better protection, especially to smaller vehicle occupants, though GM did not find a safety performance improvement in vehicles with seat-mounted belts versus belts mounted to the vehicle body.

Belt-in-Seat type belts have been used by automakers in convertibles and pillarless hardtops, where there is no "B" pillar to affix the upper mount of the belt. Chrysler and Cadillac are well known for using this design. Antique auto enthusiasts sometimes replace original seats in their cars with BIS-equipped front seats, providing a measure of safety not available when these cars were new. However, modern BIS systems typically use electronics that must be installed and connected with the seats and the vehicle's electrical system in order to function properly.

=== 4-, 5-, and 6-point ===
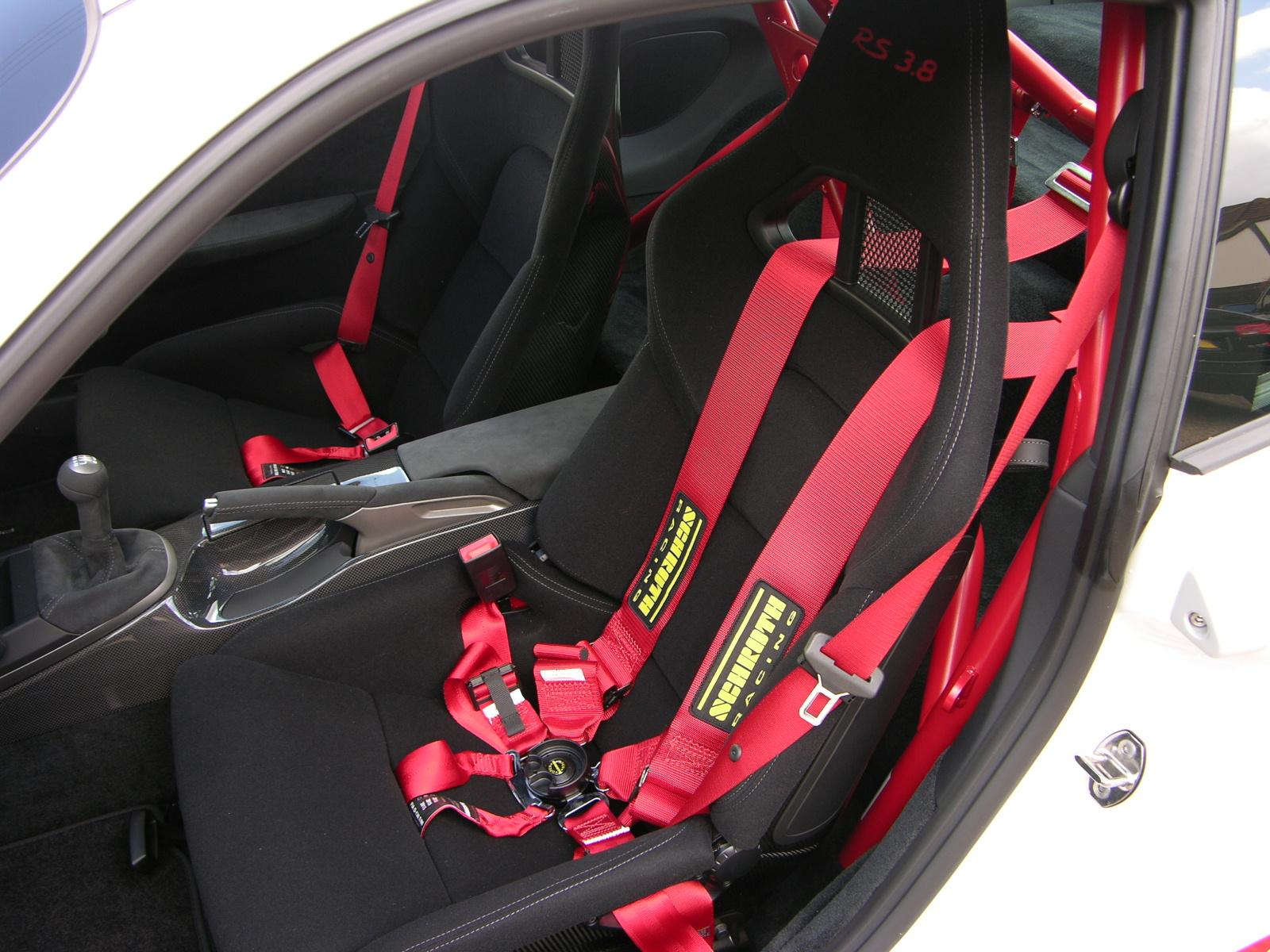
Bucket seat combined with a Schroth six-point harness

Five-point harnesses are typically found in child safety seats and in racing cars. The lap portion is connected to a belt between the legs and there are two shoulder belts, making a total of five points of attachment to the seat. A 4-point harness is similar, but without the strap between the legs, while a 6-point harness has two belts between the legs. In NASCAR, the 6-point harness became popular after the death of Dale Earnhardt, who was wearing a five-point harness when he suffered his fatal crash. As it was first thought that his belt had broken, and broke his neck at impact, some teams ordered a six-point harness in response.

=== Seven-point ===
Aerobatic aircraft frequently use a combination harness consisting of a five-point harness with a redundant lap belt attached to a different part of the aircraft. While providing redundancy for negative-g maneuvers (which lift the pilot out of the seat), they also require the pilot to unlatch two harnesses if it is necessary to parachute from a failed aircraft.

== Technology ==
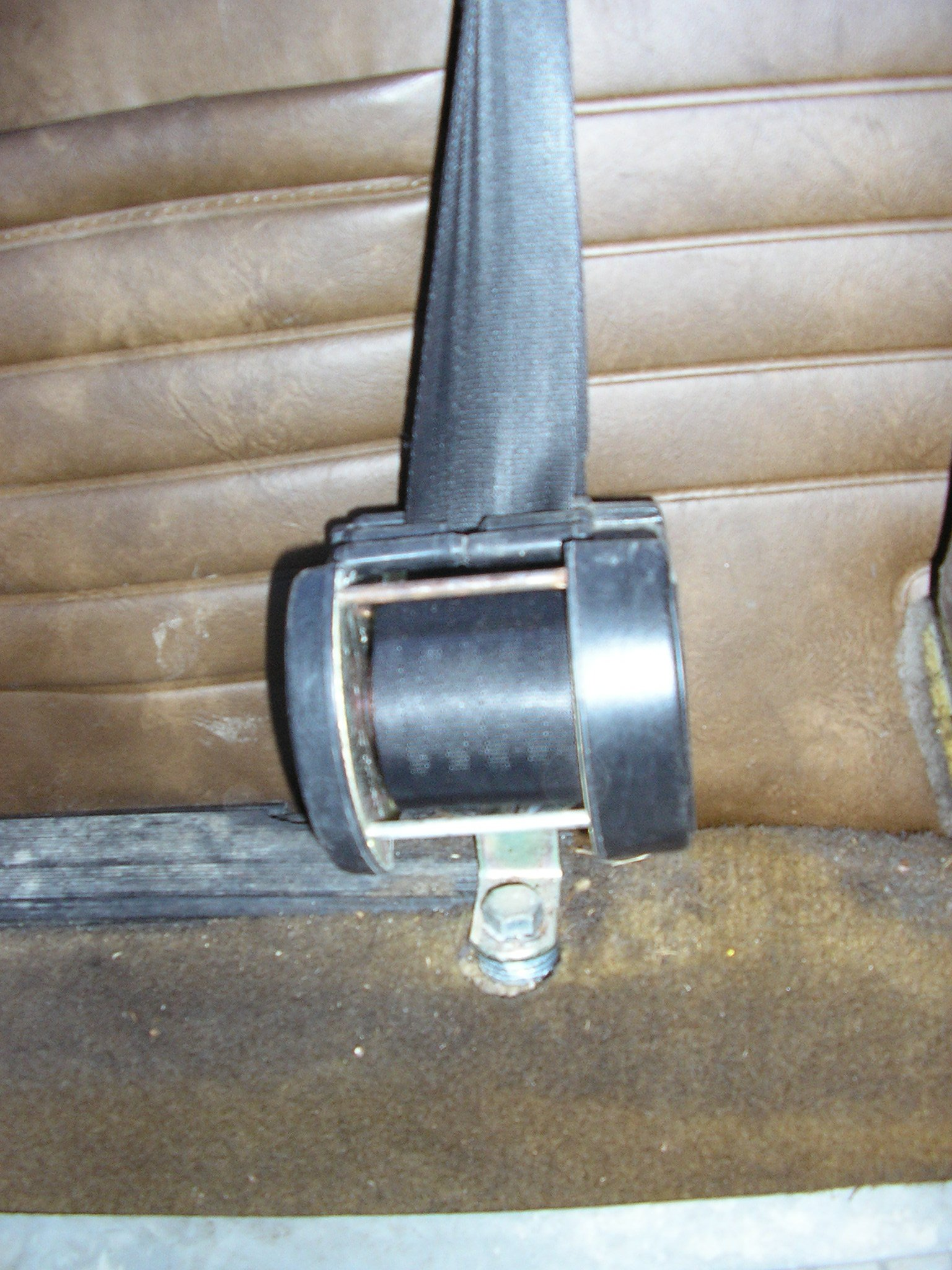
Seat belt with uncovered inertial reel

=== Locking retractors ===
The purpose of locking retractors (sometimes called emergency locking retractors, or ELRs) is to provide the seated occupant the convenience of some free movement of the upper torso within the compartment while providing a method of limiting this movement in the event of a crash. Starting in 1996, all passenger vehicles were required to lock pre-crash, meaning they have a locking mechanism in the retractor or in the latch plate. Seat belts are stowed on spring-loaded reels, called retractors, equipped with inertial locking mechanisms that stop the belt from extending off the reel during severe deceleration.

There are two main types of inertial seat belt locks. A webbing-sensitive lock is based on a centrifugal clutch activated by the rapid acceleration of the strap (webbing) from the reel. The belt can be pulled from the reel only slowly and gradually, as when the occupant extends the belt to fasten it. A sudden rapid pull of the belt—as in a sudden braking or collision event—causes the reel to lock, restraining the occupant in position. The first automatic locking retractor for seat belts and shoulder harnesses in the U.S. was the Irving "Dynalock" safety device. These "Auto-lock" front lap belts were optional on AMC cars with bucket seats in 1967.

A vehicle-sensitive lock is based on a pendulum swung away from its plumb position by rapid deceleration or rollover of the vehicle. In the absence of rapid deceleration or rollover, the reel is unlocked and the belt strap may be pulled from the reel against the spring tension of the reel. The vehicle occupant can move around with relative freedom while the spring tension of the reel keeps the belt taut against the occupant. When the pendulum swings away from its normal plumb position due to sudden deceleration or rollover, a pawl is engaged, the reel locks and the strap restrains the belted occupant in position. Dual-sensing locking retractors use both vehicle G-loading and webbing payout rate to initiate the locking mechanism.

=== Pretensioners and webclamps ===
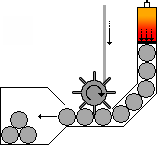
Pyrotechnic pretensioner diagram

Seat belts in many newer vehicles are also equipped with "pretensioners" or "web clamps", or both. Pre-tensioners are used for safety. In a crash, a small charge quickly tightens the belt to remove slack. Together with load limiters, they improve safety. Mercedes-Benz first introduced pretensioners on the 1981 S-Class. In the event of a crash, a pretensioner will tighten the belt almost instantaneously. This reduces the motion of the occupant in a violent crash. Like airbags, pretensioners are triggered by sensors in the car's body, and many pretensioners have used explosively expanding gas to drive a piston that retracts the belt. Pretensioners also lower the risk of "submarining", which occurs when a passenger slides forward under a loosely fitted seat belt.

Some systems also pre-emptively tighten the belt during fast accelerations and strong decelerations, even if no crash has happened. This has the advantage that it may help prevent the driver from sliding out of position during violent evasive maneuvers, which could cause loss of control of the vehicle. These pre-emptive safety systems may prevent some collisions from happening, as well as reduce injuries in the event an actual collision occurs. Pre-emptive systems generally use electric pretensioners, which can operate repeatedly and for a sustained period, rather than pyrotechnic pretensioners, which can only operate a single time.

Webclamps stop the webbing in the event of an accident and limit the distance the webbing can spool out (caused by the unused webbing tightening on the central drum of the mechanism). These belts also often incorporate an energy management loop ("rip stitching") in which a section of the webbing is looped and stitched with special stitching. The function of this is to "rip" at a predetermined load, which reduces the maximum force transmitted through the belt to the occupant during a violent collision, reducing injuries to the occupant.

A study demonstrated that standard automotive three-point restraints fitted with pyrotechnic or electric pretensioners were not able to eliminate all interior passenger compartment head strikes in rollover test conditions. Electric pretensioners are often incorporated on vehicles equipped with precrash systems; they are designed to reduce seat belt slack in a potential collision and assist in placing the occupants in a more optimal seating position. The electric pretensioners also can operate on a repeated or sustained basis, providing better protection in the event of an extended rollover or a multiple collision accident.

=== Inflatable ===
The inflatable seat belt was invented by Donald Lewis and tested at the Automotive Products Division of Allied Chemical Corporation. Inflatable seat belts have tubular inflatable bladders contained within an outer cover. When a crash occurs, the bladder inflates with gas to increase the area of the restraint contacting the occupant and also shortening the length of the restraint to tighten the belt around the occupant, improving the protection. The inflatable sections may be shoulder-only or lap and shoulder. The system supports the head during the crash better than a web-only belt. It also provides side impact protection. In 2013, Ford began offering rear-seat inflatable seat belts on a limited set of models, such as the Explorer and Flex.

=== Automatic ===
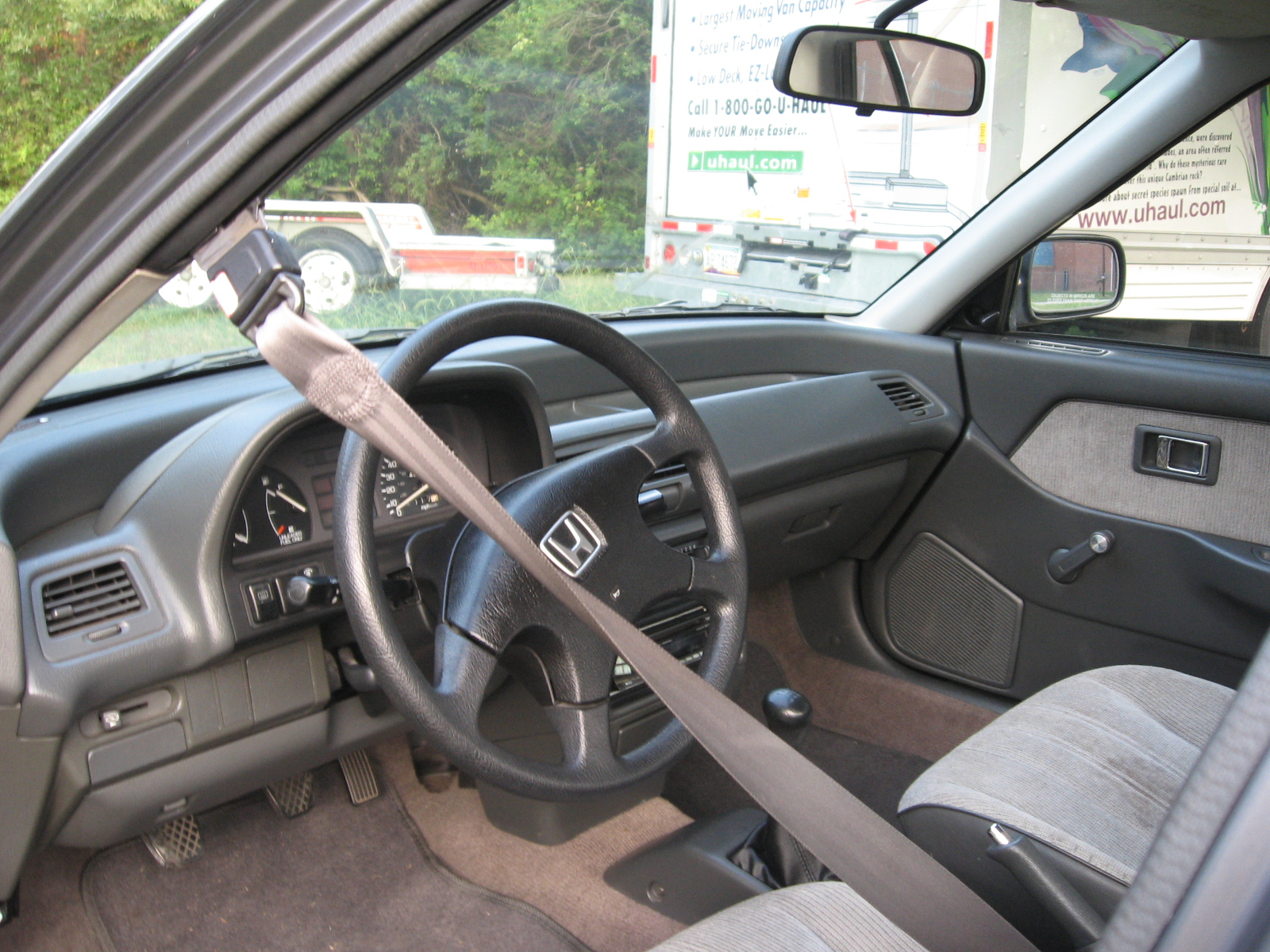
Automatic seat belt in a Honda Civic

Seat belts that automatically move into position around a vehicle occupant once the adjacent door is closed and/or the engine is started were developed as a countermeasure against low usage rates of manual seat belts, particularly in the United States. The 1972 Volkswagen ESVW1 Experimental Safety Vehicle presented passive seat belts. Volvo tried to develop a passive three point seat belt. In 1973, Volkswagen announced they had a functional passive seat belt. The first commercial car to use automatic seat belts was the 1975 Volkswagen Golf.

Automatic seat belts received a boost in the United States in 1977 when Brock Adams, United States Secretary of Transportation in the Carter Administration, mandated that by 1983 every new car should have either airbags or automatic seat belts. There was strong lobbying against the passive restraint requirement by the auto industry. Adams was criticized by Ralph Nader, who said that the 1983 deadline was too late. The Volkswagen Rabbit also had automatic seat belts, and VW said that by early 1978, 90,000 cars had sold with them.

General Motors introduced a three-point non-motorized passive belt system in 1980 to comply with the passive restraint requirement. However, it was used as an active lap-shoulder belt because of unlatching the belt to exit the vehicle. Despite this common practice, field studies of belt use still showed an increase in wearing rates with this door-mounted system. General Motors began offering automatic seat belts on the Chevrolet Chevette. However, the company reported disappointing sales because of this feature. For the 1981 model year, the new Toyota Cressida became the first car to offer motorized automatic passive seat belts.

A study released in 1978 by the United States Department of Transportation said that cars with automatic seat belts had a fatality rate of .78 per 100 million miles, compared with 2.34 for cars with regular, manual belts.

In 1981, Drew Lewis, the first Transportation Secretary of the Reagan Administration, influenced by studies done by the auto industry, dropped the mandate; the decision was overruled in a federal appeals court the following year, and then by the Supreme Court. In 1984, the Reagan Administration reversed its course, though in the meantime the original deadline had been extended; Elizabeth Dole, then Transportation Secretary, proposed that the two passive safety restraints be phased into vehicles gradually, from vehicle model year 1987 to vehicle model year 1990, when all vehicles would be required to have either automatic seat belts or driver side air bags. Though more awkward for vehicle occupants, most manufacturers opted to use less expensive automatic belts rather than airbags during this time period.

When driver side airbags became mandatory on all passenger vehicles in model year 1995, most manufacturers stopped equipping cars with automatic seat belts. Exceptions include the 1995–96 Ford Escort/Mercury Tracer and the Eagle Summit Wagon, which had automatic safety belts along with dual airbags.

==== Systems ====
- Manual lap belt with automatic motorized shoulder belt: When the door is opened, the shoulder belt moves from a fixed point near the seat back on a track mounted in the door frame of the car to a point at the other end of the track near the windshield. Once the door is closed and the car is started, the belt moves rearward along the track to its original position, thus securing the passenger. The lap belt must be fastened manually.
- Manual lap belt with automatic non-motorized shoulder belt: This system was used in American-market vehicles such as the Hyundai Excel and Volkswagen Jetta. The shoulder belt is fixed to the aft upper corner of the vehicle door and is not motorized. The lap belt must be fastened manually.
- Automatic shoulder and lap belts: This system was mainly used in General Motors vehicles, though it was also used on some Honda Civic hatchbacks and Nissan Sentra coupes. When the door is opened, the belts go from a fixed point in the middle of the car by the floor to the retractors on the door. Passengers must slide into the car under the belts. When the door closes, the seat belt retracts into the door. The belts have normal release buttons that are supposed to be used only in an emergency, but in practice are routinely used in the same manner as manual seat belt clasps. This system also found use by American Specialty Cars when they created the 1991–1994 convertible special edition of the Nissan 240SX, a car that traditionally had a motorized shoulder belt.

==== Disadvantages ====
Automatic belt systems generally offer inferior occupant crash protection. In systems with belts attached to the door rather than a sturdier fixed portion of the vehicle body, a crash that causes the vehicle door to open leaves the occupant without belt protection. In such a scenario, the occupant may be thrown from the vehicle and suffer greater injury or death.

Because many automatic belt system designs compliant with the U.S. passive-restraint mandate did not meet the anchorage requirements of Canada (CMVSS 210)—which were not weakened to accommodate automatic belts—vehicle models that had been eligible for easy importation in either direction across the U.S.-Canada border when equipped with manual belts became ineligible for importation in either direction once the U.S. variants obtained automatic belts and the Canadian versions retained manual belts, although some Canadian versions also had automatic seat belts. Two particular models affected were the Dodge Spirit and Plymouth Acclaim.

Automatic belt systems also present several operational disadvantages. Motorists who would normally wear seat belts must still fasten the manual lap belt, thus rendering redundant the automation of the shoulder belt. Those who do not fasten the lap belt wind up inadequately protected only by the shoulder belt. In a crash, without a lap belt, such a vehicle occupant is likely to "submarine" (be thrown forward under the shoulder belt) and be seriously injured. Motorized or door-affixed shoulder belts hinder access to the vehicle, making it difficult to enter and exit—particularly if the occupant is carrying items such as a box or a purse. Vehicle owners tend to disconnect the motorized or door-affixed shoulder belt to relieve the nuisance when entering and exiting the vehicle, leaving only a lap belt for crash protection. Also, many automatic seat belt systems are incompatible with child safety seats, or only compatible with special modifications.

== Homologation and testing ==
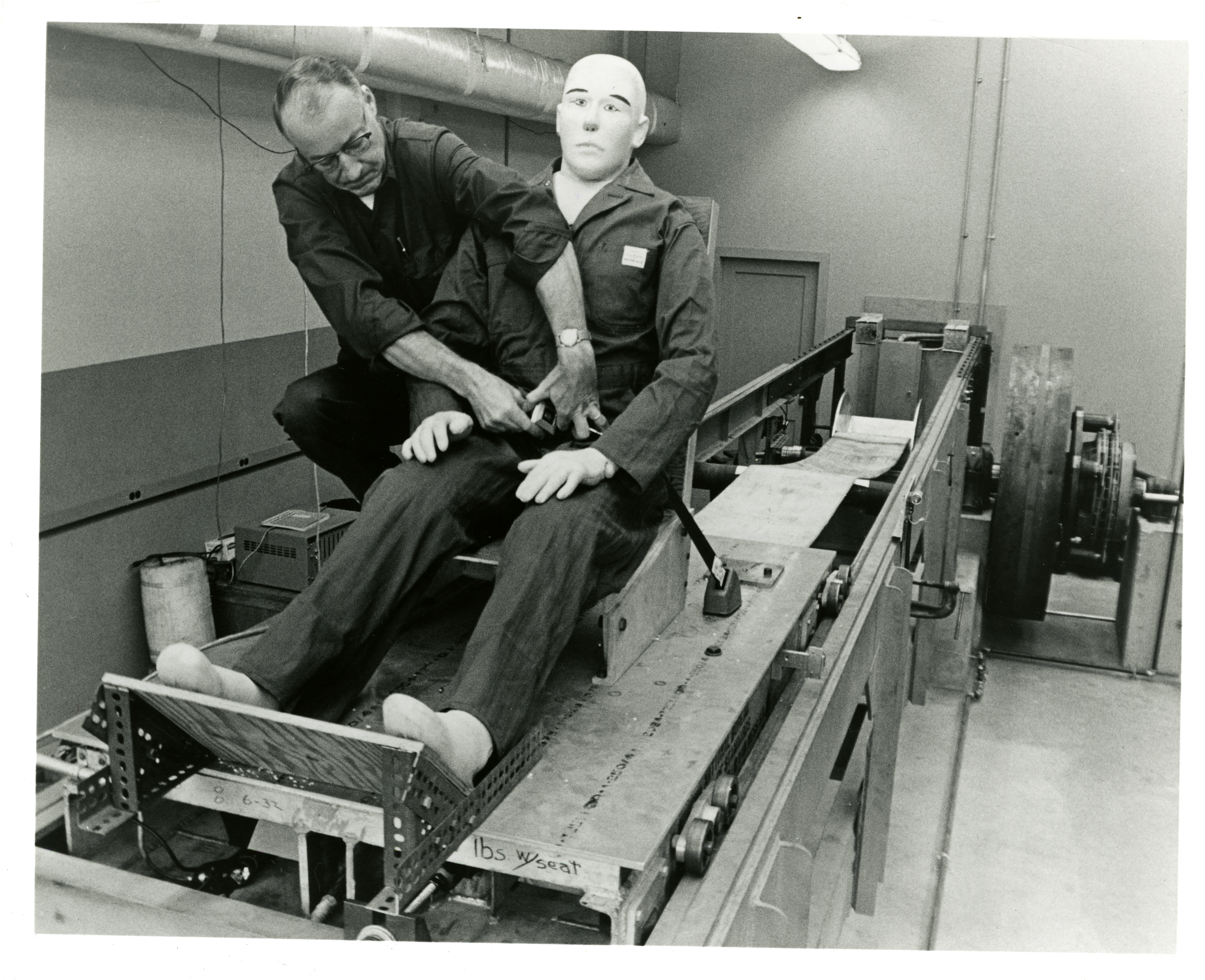
A test apparatus with a crash test dummy

Starting in 1971 and ending in 1972, the United States conducted a research project on seat belt effectiveness on a total of 40,000 vehicle occupants using car accident reports collected during that time. Of these 40,000 occupants, 18% were reported wearing lap belts, or two-point safety belts, 2% were reported wearing a three-point safety belt, and the remaining 80% were reported as wearing no safety belt. The results concluded that users of the two-point lap belt had a 73% lower fatality rate, a 53% lower serious injury rate, and a 38% lower injury rate than the occupants that were reported unrestrained. Similarly, users of the three-point safety belt had a 60% lower serious injury rate and a 41% lower rate of all other injuries. Out of the 2% described as wearing a three-point safety belt, no fatalities were reported.

This study and others led to the Restraint Systems Evaluation Program (RSEP), started by the NHTSA in 1975 to increase the reliability and authenticity of past studies. A study as part of this program used data taken from 15,000 tow-away accidents that involved only car models made between 1973 and 1975. The study found that for injuries considered "moderate" or worse, individuals wearing a three-point safety belt had a 56.5% lower injury rate than those wearing no safety belt. The study also concluded that the effectiveness of the safety belt did not differ with the size of a car. It was determined that the variation among results of the many studies conducted in the 1960s and 70s was due to the use of different methodologies, and could not be attributed to any significant variation in the effectiveness of safety belts.

Wayne State University's Automotive Safety Research Group, as well as other researchers, are testing ways to improve seat belt effectiveness and general vehicle safety apparatuses. Wayne State's Bioengineering Center uses human cadavers in their crash test research. The center's director, Albert King, wrote in 1995 that the vehicle safety improvements made possible since 1987 by the use of cadavers in research had saved nearly 6,767 lives each year, and indicated that improvements made to three-point safety belts save an average of 61 lives every year.

The New Car Assessment Program (NCAP) was put in place by the United States National Highway Traffic Safety Administration in 1979. The NCAP is a government program that evaluates vehicle safety designs and sets standards for foreign and domestic automobile companies. The agency developed a rating system and requires access to safety test results. As of September 2007, manufacturers are required to place an NCAP star rating on the automobile price sticker.

In 2004, the European New Car Assessment Program (Euro NCAP) started testing seat belts and whiplash safety on all test cars at the Thatcham Research Centre with crash test dummies.

== Experimental ==
Research and development efforts are ongoing to improve the safety performance of vehicle seat belts. Some experimental designs include:

- Criss-cross: Experimental safety belt presented in the Volvo SCC. It forms a cross-brace across the chest.
- 3+2 Point: Experimental safety belt from Autoliv similar to the criss-cross. The 3+2 improves protection against rollovers and side impacts.
- Four point "belt and suspenders": An experimental design from Ford where the "suspenders" are attached to the backrest, not to the frame of the car.
- 3-point Adjustable: Experimental safety belt from GWR Safety Systems that allowed the car Hiriko, designed by MIT, to fold without compromising the safety and comfort of the occupants.

== In rear seats ==
In 1955 (as a 1956 package), Ford offered lap-only seat belts in the rear seats as an option within the Lifeguard safety package. In 1967, Volvo started to install lap belts in the rear seats. In 1972, Volvo upgraded the rear seat belts to a three-point belt.

In crashes, unbelted rear passengers increase the risk of belted front seat occupants' death by nearly five times.

== Child occupants ==
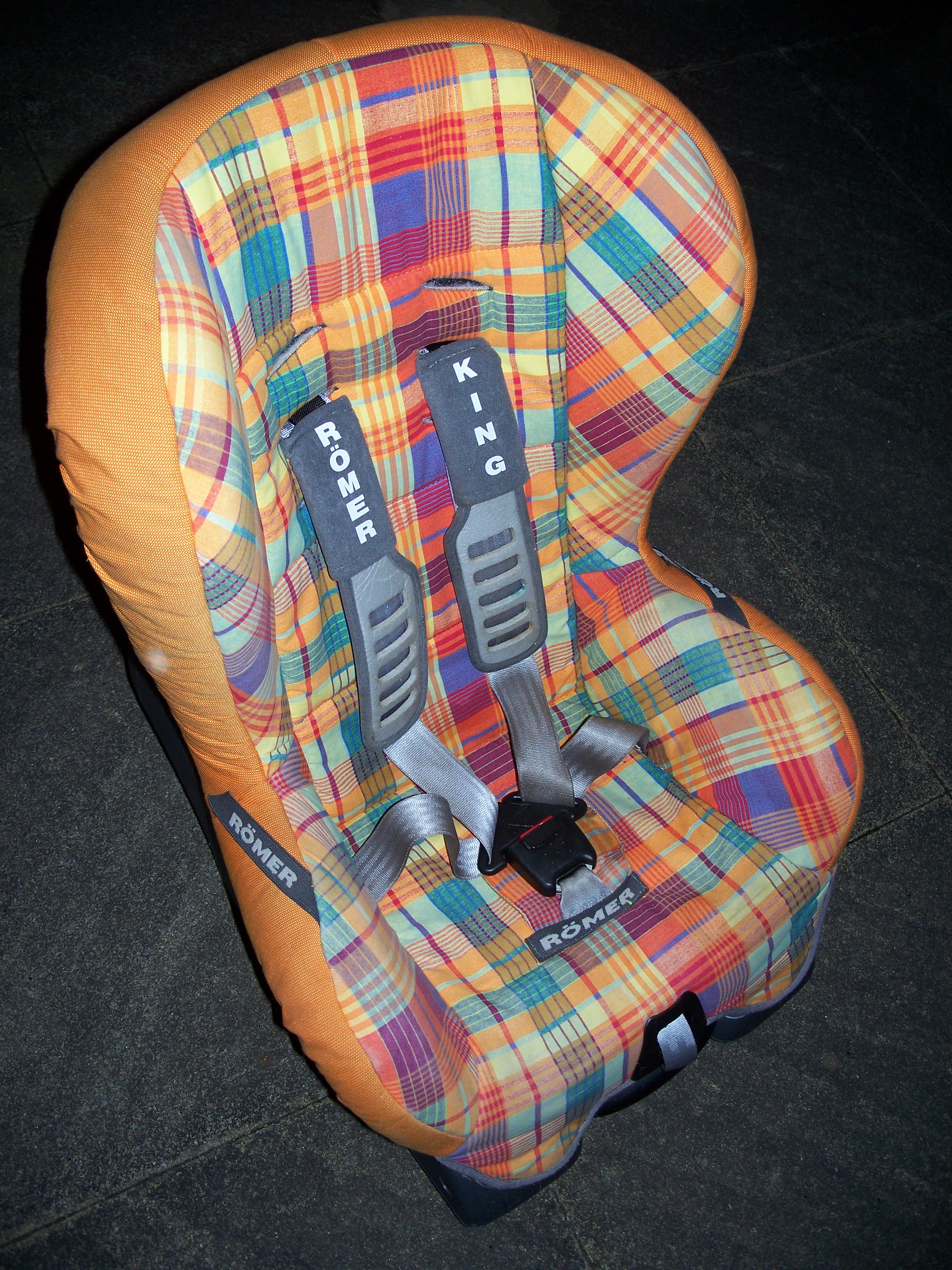
This child car seat has its own belting system.

As with adult drivers and passengers, the advent of seat belts was accompanied by calls for their use by child occupants, including legislation requiring such use. Generally, children using adult seat belts suffer significantly lower injury risk when compared to non-buckled children.

The UK extended compulsory seat belt wearing to child passengers under the age of 14 in 1989. It was observed that this measure was accompanied by a 10% increase in fatalities and a 12% increase in injuries among the target population. In crashes, small children who wear adult seat belts can suffer "seat-belt syndrome" injuries including severed intestines, ruptured diaphragms, and spinal damage. There is also research suggesting that children in inappropriate restraints are at significantly increased risk of head injury. One of the authors of this research said, "The early graduation of kids into adult lap and shoulder belts is a leading cause of child-occupant injuries and deaths."

As a result of such findings, many jurisdictions now advocate or require child passengers to use specially designed child restraints. Such systems include separate child-sized seats with their own restraints and booster cushions for children using adult restraints. In some jurisdictions, children below a certain size are forbidden to travel in front car seats.

== Automated reminders and engine start interlocks ==
Warning lights on a car dashboard

In Europe, the U.S., and some other parts of the world, most modern cars include a seat-belt reminder light for the driver and some also include a reminder for the passenger, when present, activated by a pressure sensor under the passenger seat. Some cars will intermittently flash the reminder light and sound the chime until the driver (and sometimes the front passenger, if present) fasten their seat belts.

In 2005, in Sweden, 70% of all cars that were newly registered were equipped with seat belt reminders for the driver. Since November 2014, seat belt reminders are mandatory for the driver's seat on new cars sold in Europe.

Two specifications define the standardseat belt reminders: UN Regulation 16, Section 8.4 and the Euro NCAP assessment protocol (Euro NCAP, 2013).

=== European Union seat belt reminder ===
In the European Union, seat belt reminders are mandatory in all new passenger cars for the driver seat. In 2014, EC Regulation 661/2009 made UN Regulation 16 applicable.

An amendment of UN Regulation 16 made seat belt reminders mandatory in

- all front and rear seats of passenger cars and vans,
- all front seats of buses and trucks.

This improvement applies from 1 September 2019 for new types of motor vehicles and from 1 September 2021 for all new motor vehicles.

=== U.S. regulation history ===
Federal Motor Vehicle Safety Standard No. 208 (FMVSS 208) was amended by the NHTSA to require a seat belt/starter interlock system to prevent passenger cars from being started with an unbelted front-seat occupant. This mandate applied to passenger cars built after August 1973, i.e., starting with the 1974 model year. The specifications required the system to permit the car to be started only if the belt of an occupied seat were fastened after the occupant sat down, so pre-buckling the belts would not defeat the system.

The interlock systems used logic modules complex enough to require special diagnostic computers, and were not entirely dependable—an override button was provided under the hood of equipped cars, permitting one (but only one) "free" starting attempt each time it was pressed. However, the interlock system spurred severe backlash from an American public who largely rejected seat belts. In 1974, Congress acted to prohibit NHTSA from requiring or permitting a system that prevents a vehicle from starting or operating with an unbelted occupant, or that gives an audible warning of an unfastened belt for more than 8 seconds after the ignition is turned on. This prohibition took effect on 27 October 1974, shortly after the 1975 model year began.

In response to the Congressional action, NHTSA once again amended FMVSS 208, requiring vehicles to come with a seat belt reminder system that gives an audible signal for four to eight seconds and a warning light for at least 60 seconds after the ignition is turned on if the driver's seat belt is not fastened. This is called a seat belt reminder (SBR) system. In the mid-1990s, the Swedish insurance company Folksam worked with Saab and Ford to determine the requirements for the most efficient seat belt reminder. One characteristic of the optimal SBR, according to their research, is that the audible warning becomes increasingly penetrating the longer the seat belt remains unfastened.

=== Efficacy ===
In 2001, the House Appropriations Committee directed NHTSA to study the benefits of technology meant to increase the use of seat belts. NHTSA found that seat belt usage had increased to 73% since the initial introduction of the SBR system. In 2002, Ford demonstrated that seat belts were used more in Fords with seat belt reminders than in those without: 76% and 71% respectively. In 2007, Honda conducted a similar study and found that 90% of people who drove Hondas with seat belt reminders used a seat belt, while 84% of people who drove Hondas without seat belt reminders used a seat belt.

In 2003, the Transportation Research Board Committee, chaired by two psychologists, reported that "Enhanced SBRs" (ESBRs) could save an additional 1,000 lives a year. Research by the Insurance Institute for Highway Safety found that Ford's ESBR, which provides an intermittent chime for up to five minutes if the driver is unbelted, sounding for six seconds then pausing for 30, increased seat belt use by five percentage points. Farmer and Wells found that driver fatality rates were 6% lower for vehicles with ESBR compared with otherwise-identical vehicles without.

=== Delayed start ===
Starting with the 2020 model year, some Chevrolet cars refused to shift from Park to Drive for 20 seconds if the driver is unbuckled and the car is in "teen driver" mode. A similar feature was previously available on some General Motors fleet cars.

== Regulation by country ==
=== International regulations ===
Several countries apply UN-ECE vehicle regulations 14 and 16:

- UN Regulation No. 14: safety belt anchorages
- UN Regulation No. 16:
  - Safety belts, restraint systems, child restraint systems, and ISOFIX child restraint systems for occupants of power-driven vehicles
  - Vehicles equipped with safety belts, safety belt reminders, restraint systems, child restraint systems and ISOFIX child restraint systems and i-Size child restraint systems
- UN Regulation No. 44: restraining devices for child occupants of power-driven vehicles ("Child Restraint Systems")
- UN Regulation No. 129: Enhanced Child Restraint Systems

international safety regulations
Continent	Country	Reg 14	Reg 16	Reg 44	Reg 129
Eurasia	European Union	Yes	Yes	Yes	Yes
Eurasia	Serbia	Yes	Yes	Yes	Yes
Eurasia	United Kingdom	Yes	Yes	Yes	Yes
Eurasia	Switzerland	Yes	Yes	Yes	Yes
Eurasia	Norway	Yes	Yes	Yes	Yes
Eurasia	Russia	Yes	Yes	Yes	Yes
Eurasia	Belarus	Yes	Yes	Yes	Yes
Eurasia	Moldova	Yes	Yes	Yes	Yes
Eurasia	Bosnia	Yes	Yes		Yes
Eurasia	Turkey	Yes	Yes	Yes	Yes
Eurasia	North Macedonia	Yes	Yes	Yes	Yes
Eurasia	Japan	Yes	Yes	Yes	Yes
Eurasia	Ukraine	Yes	Yes	Yes	Yes
Eurasia	Albania	Yes	Yes	Yes	Yes
Eurasia	Malaysia	Yes	Yes	Yes	Yes
Australasia	New Zealand	Yes	Yes		Yes
Africa	South Africa	Yes			Yes
Africa	Egypt	Yes	Yes	Yes	Yes
Africa	Nigeria	Yes	Yes	Yes	Yes

=== Local regulations ===
	UNECE: European Union; Japan; United Kingdom; Russia; Ukraine; Turkey; Egypt	(United States) U.S.	India	Japan	China	South Korea	Australia	(Cooperation Council for the Arab States of the Gulf) Gulf
Seat belts	UN R14	FMVSS 209	AIS-015					GSO 96/1988, GSO 97/1988
Child restraint system	UN R44, R129	FMVSS 213	AIS-072	JIS D 040122000	GB 14166-2013	KMVSS 103-2	AS/NZS 1754:2013; AS/NZS 3629:2013	GSO 1709/2005, GSO 1710/2005

== Legislation ==
In observational studies of car crash morbidity and mortality, experiments using both crash test dummies and human cadavers indicate that wearing seat belts greatly reduces the risk of death and injury in the majority of car crashes.

This has led many countries to adopt mandatory seat belt wearing laws. It is generally accepted that, in comparing like-for-like accidents, a vehicle occupant not wearing a properly fitted seat belt has a significantly and substantially higher chance of death and serious injury. One large observation studying using U.S. data showed that the odds ratio of crash death is 0.46 with a three-point belt when compared with no belt. In another study that examined injuries presenting to the ER pre- and post-seat belt law introduction, it was found that 40% more escaped injury and 35% more escaped mild and moderate injuries.

The effects of seat belt laws are disputed by those who observe that their passage did not reduce road fatalities. There has also been concern that instead of legislating for a general protection standard for vehicle occupants, laws that required a particular technical approach would rapidly become dated as motor manufacturers would tool up for a particular standard that could not easily be changed. For example, in 1969 there were competing designs for lap and three-point seat belts, rapidly tilting seats, and airbags being developed. As countries started to mandate seat belt restraints the global auto industry invested in the tooling and standardized exclusively on seat belts, and ignored other restraint designs such as airbags for several decades

As of 2016, seat belt laws can be divided into two categories: primary and secondary. A primary seat belt law allows an officer to issue a citation for lack of seat belt use without any other citation, whereas a secondary seat belt law allows an officer to issue a seat belt citation only in the presence of a different violation. In the United States, fifteen states enforce secondary laws, while 34 states, as well as the District of Columbia, American Samoa, Guam, the Northern Mariana Islands, Puerto Rico, and the Virgin Islands enforce primary seat belt laws. New Hampshire lacks either a primary or secondary seat belt law.

=== Risk compensation ===
Some have proposed that the number of deaths was influenced by the development of risk compensation, which says that drivers adjust their behavior in response to the increased sense of personal safety wearing a seat belt provides.

In one trial subjects were asked to drive go-karts around a track under various conditions. It was found that subjects who started driving unbelted drove consistently faster when subsequently belted. Similarly, a study of habitual non-seat belt wearers driving in freeway conditions found evidence that they had adapted to use by adopting higher driving speeds and closer following distances.

A 2001 analysis of U.S. crash data aimed to establish the effects of legislation on driving fatalities and found that previous estimates of seat belt effectiveness had been significantly overstated.

According to the analysis, seat belts decreased fatalities by 1.35% for each 10% increase in seat belt use. The study controlled for endogenous motivations for seat belt use, because they create an artificial correlation between seat belt use and fatalities, leading to the conclusion that seat belts cause fatalities. For example, drivers in high-risk areas are more likely to use seat belts and are more likely to be in accidents, creating a non-causal correlation between seat belt use and mortality. After accounting for the endogeneity of seat belt usage, Cohen and Einav found no evidence that the risk compensation effect makes seat belt-wearing drivers more dangerous, a finding at variance with other research.

=== Increased traffic ===
Other statistical analyses have included adjustments for factors such as increased traffic and age, and based on these adjustments, which results in a reduction of morbidity and mortality due to seat belt use. However, Smeed's law predicts a fall in accident rate with increasing car ownership and has been demonstrated independently of seat belt legislation.

== Mass transit considerations ==
=== Buses ===
==== School buses ====
In the U.S., six states—California, Florida, Louisiana, New Jersey, New York, and Texas—require seat belts on school buses.

Pros and cons have been debated about the use of seat belts in school buses. School buses, which are much bigger than the average vehicle, allow for the mass transportation of students from place to place. The American School Bus Council states in a brief article: "The children are protected like eggs in an egg carton—compartmentalized, and surrounded with padding and structural integrity to secure the entire container." Although school buses are considered safe for mass transit of students, this will not guarantee that the students will be injury-free if an impact were to occur. Seat belts in buses are sometimes believed to make recovering from a roll or tip harder for passengers, as they could be easily trapped in their own safety belts.

In 2015, for the first time, NHTSA endorsed seat belts on school buses.

==== Motor coaches ====
In the European Union, all new long-distance buses and coaches must be fitted with seat belts.

Australia has required lap/sash seat belts in new coaches since 1994. These must comply with Australian Design Rule 68, which requires the seat belt, seat and seat anchorage to withstand 20g deceleration and an impact by an unrestrained occupant to the rear.

In the United States, NHTSA now requires lap-shoulder seat belts in new "over-the-road" buses (includes most coaches) starting in 2016.

=== Trains ===
The use of seat belts in trains has been investigated. Concerns about survival space intrusion in train crashes and increased injuries to unrestrained or incorrectly restrained passengers led researchers to discourage the use of seat belts in trains.

It has been shown that there is no net safety benefit for passengers who choose to wear 3-point restraints on passenger-carrying rail vehicles. Generally, passengers who choose not to wear restraints in a vehicle modified to accept 3-point restraints receive marginally more severe injuries.

In the United States, recreational railbikes are required to be fitted with seat belts, with the most common one being the lap belt.

=== Airplanes ===
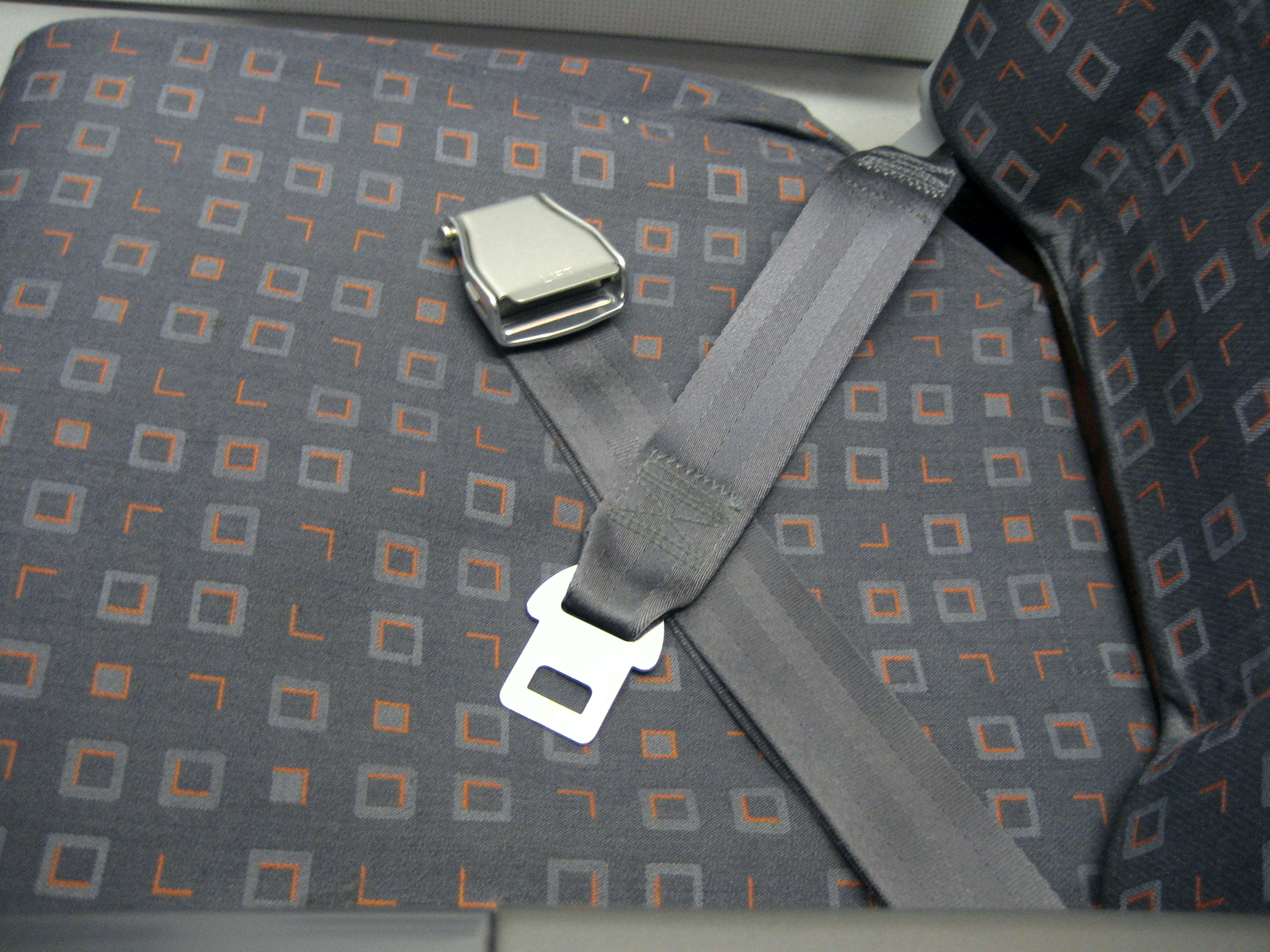
An airplane lap seat belt

All aerobatic aircraft and gliders (sailplanes) are fitted with four or five-point harnesses, as are many types of light aircraft and many types of military aircraft. The seat belts in these aircraft have the dual function of crash protection and keeping the pilot(s) and crew in their seat(s) during turbulence and aerobatic maneuvers. Airliner passenger seats are fitted with lap belts. Unlike road vehicles, airliner seat belts are not primarily designed for crash protection. Their main purpose is to keep passengers in their seats during events such as turbulence. Many civil aviation authorities require a "fasten seat belt" sign in the cabin that can be activated by a pilot during taxiing, takeoff, turbulence, and landing. The International Civil Aviation Organization recommends the use of child restraints. Some airline authorities, including the UK Civil Aviation Authority (CAA), permit the use of airline infant lap belts (sometimes known as an infant loop or belly belt) to secure an infant under age two sitting on an adult's lap.

== See also ==
- Automobile safety
- Baby transport
- Crashworthiness
- List of auto parts
- Passive safety device
- Safety harness
- Seat belt use rates by country
