= Tapping (disambiguation) =

Tapping is a guitar-playing technique.

Tapping may also refer to:

== People ==
- Amanda Tapping (born 1965), English-Canadian actress
- Callum Tapping (born 1993), Scottish footballer
- Harold Tapping (1901–1964), Australian politician
- Harry Tapping (1926–2008), New Zealand cricketer
- Tapping Reeve (1744–1823), American lawyer, judge and law educator, brother-in-law of Aaron Burr

== Other uses ==
- Tapping, Western Australia, a suburb of Perth
- Rubber tapping, the process by which latex is collected from a rubber tree
- Telephone tapping, or wire tapping, the monitoring of telephone and internet conversations
- Tapping or flapping, a change in the pronunciation of /t/ or /d/ in some types of English
- Tapping, the process of cutting or forming threads using a tap and die
- Tapping, touching a touchscreen
- Tapping and untapping, a game mechanic in Magic:The Gathering
- Tapping, a method of cheating in online games
- Emotional Freedom Techniques, also known as "tapping", a pseudoscience that claims to have health benefits

== See also ==
- Tap (disambiguation)
