= C. Hunter Shelden =

American neurosurgeon (1907–2003)

C. Hunter Shelden (March 27, 1907 – January 12, 2003) was an American neurosurgeon and medical researcher known for his contributions to automotive safety and the development of percutaneous tracheostomy. In a widely cited 1955 paper on automobile-related head injuries, he advocated retractable seat belts and a range of other vehicle-safety measures. He also contributed to the development of neurosurgical training, stereotactic surgery, and medical imaging.

== Education and medical career ==
Born in Minneapolis, Minnesota, Shelden completed his pre-medical studies at the University of Wisconsin and Albert Ludwigs Universitaet in Freiburg, Germany, before receiving his M.D. from the University of Pennsylvania in 1932. He subsequently served on the staff of the Mayo Clinic, where his father, physician Walter D. Shelden, was also associated with the clinic. Shelden received part of his surgical training under neurosurgeon Winchell McKendree Craig.

Shelden joined the medical staff of Huntington Memorial Hospital in Pasadena, California, in 1940, and is believed to have been the hospital's first full-time neurosurgeon. By 1942, he maintained offices in Pasadena and Los Angeles and served on the staffs of Huntington Memorial, St. Luke Hospital in Altadena, and St. Vincent's and Santa Fe hospitals in Los Angeles.

During World War II, Shelden volunteered for service in the United States Navy, and in September 1942 was ordered to the National Naval Medical Center in Bethesda, Maryland, where he again worked under Craig. He also worked there with neurosurgeon Robert H. Pudenz, with whom he would form a lifelong friendship and professional partnership. Shelden returned to Pasadena with Pudenz in 1946, and the two developed a neurosurgical training program for the Navy that trained several neurosurgeons before it was discontinued.

Shelden and Pudenz subsequently helped develop what became the Huntington Medical Research Institute (HMRI). In 1948, Shelden was named to head a new clinic being established by the Pasadena Dispensary.

== Medical research ==
Shelden's research encompassed neurosurgery, head injuries, airway surgery, and later stereotactic techniques and medical imaging. In 1955, Shelden, Pudenz, Donald B. Freshwater and Benjamin L. Crue described a new method of performing a tracheotomy by a percutaneous approach. Their technique involved puncturing the trachea with a specially designed needle and introducing a cutting instrument and tracheostomy tube through the resulting opening. The procedure became known as the Shelden technique and came to generally be identified in medical literature as the first modern description of percutaneous tracheostomy. The original technique did not use a guidewire and required blind introduction of a bladed instrument, creating a risk of injury to structures adjacent to the trachea; complications limited its adoption. Later percutaneous tracheostomy techniques incorporated guidewires and dilators, particularly the technique introduced by Pasquale Ciaglia and colleagues in 1985.

Continuing his study of head injuries as part of his clinical work, with Pudenz and Edwin M. Todd, he published a 1961 study of head injuries in infants and young children, describing injuries associated with the anatomical immaturity of the skull, meninges and brain and contemporary methods for managing cerebral edema and other complications. Other clinical research included work with Pudenz, Freshwater and Crue on hypophysectomy as a potential treatment for metastatic breast cancer.

Shelden later took an interest in stereotactic surgery, working with engineers and scientists at the nearby Jet Propulsion Laboratory to develop a stereotactic surgical system, work for which he received a medal from NASA in 1979. Shelden was also interested in medical imaging, and was influential in establishing at HMRI what has been described as the first clinical magnetic resonance imaging scanner in Southern California.

== Automotive safety advocacy ==
Shelden's experience treating patients with severe head injuries from motor vehicle collisions led him to investigate the relationship between automobile design and traumatic injury. In November 1955, he published "Prevention, the only cure for head injuries resulting from automobile accidents" as the lead article in the Journal of the American Medical Association. There, he argued that automobile design itself was responsible for a substantial portion of serious and fatal head injuries, and that prevention required redesigning passenger compartments, rather than relying solely on improvements in medical treatment after collisions.

Among the safety measures he advocated were retractable seat belts, recessed steering wheels, reinforced roofs, roll bars, improved door locks, and passive restraints resembling later airbags. He also criticized protruding knobs and ornamental metal components inside automobiles as sources of head injury. Shelden estimated that changes in automobile construction could prevent as many as three-quarters of fatal head injuries sustained in motor vehicle collisions. Later histories of the treatment of automobile-related head injury note Shelden's paper as an influential systematic medical critique of unsafe automobile design.

== Other professional activities ==
Shelden was active in professional neurosurgical organizations, serving as vice president of the American Academy of Neurological Surgery in 1959, and as a founding member of the Western Neurosurgical Society.

== Personal life and death ==
Shelden and his wife, Betty, were married for 68 years, and had three sons.

Shelden died in Pasadena, California, after a brief illness, at the age of 95.
