= Tap Qaraqoyunlu =

- Municipality
- Location within Azerbaijan
- Coordinates: 40°25′42″N 46°46′14″E
- Country: Azerbaijan
- District: Goranboy

Population
  - Total: 2,415
- Time zone: UTC+4 (AZT)
  - Summer (DST): UTC+5 (AZT)

Tap Qaraqoyunlu (Tap Garagoyunlu) is a village and municipality in the Goranboy District of Azerbaijan. It has a population of 2,415. The municipality consists of the villages of Tap Qaraqoyunlu and Tap.

== Notable natives ==
- Niyazi Aslanov — National Hero of Azerbaijan.
