= Tap, Azerbaijan =

Coordinates: 40°25′N 46°47′E

Tap is a village in the municipality of Tap Qaraqoyunlu in the Goranboy Rayon of Azerbaijan.
