= Tap! =

- Editor: Christopher Phin
- Categories: iOS, Computing
- Frequency: Issue 1-3 bi-monthly, from issue 4 forward monthly
- Founder: Christopher Phin
- First issue: November 2010
- Final issue: August 2013
- Company: Future plc
- Country: United Kingdom
- Language: English
- Website: www.tapmag.co.uk

Tap! was a magazine for owners of Apple’s iOS devices (iPhone, iPad and iPod Touch), published by Future plc. It was established by Christopher Phin and was a sister title to MacFormat.

== Content ==
The magazine selected and reviewed apps and games from the App Store as well as a range of hardware accessories for iOS devices. There were tutorials on getting the most from your iPad, iPhone or iPod Touch, getting started help for those who are new to the platform, and a small section that gives best practice and technical advice to iOS developers.

The last issue of the magazine was published in August 2013.

== Editorial team ==
- Editor Christopher Phin
- Editor-in-Chief Graham Barlow
- Production Editor Matthew Bolton
- Staff Writer Laurence Cable
- Deputy Art Editor Chris Hedley
- Games Editor Craig Grannell
- Developer Evangelist Matt Gemmell
