= Taps (2006 film) =

- Directed by: Vincent Versace
- Written by: Nogen Melamed; Vincent Versace
- Produced by: George Cuddy; Nogen Melamed; Mike Sanders; Vincent Versace
- Starring: Ben Kurland; Karim Muasher; Ina Marie Smith; Vincent Versace
- Cinematography: Nogen Melamed
- Edited by: Vincent Versace
- Release date: August 8, 2006 (Rhode Island International Film Festival)
- Running time: 19 minutes
- Country: United States
- Language: English

Taps is a 2006 short film. The film was screened at the 2006 Rhode Island Film Festival. It was directed by Vincent Versace and starred Ben Kurland, Karim Muasher, Ina Marie Smith, and Vincent Versace. A surprise at the festival, the film won first prize in the best short category.

== Plot ==
The draft has been reinstated, and on the night before being shipped off to war, Robbie and his friends share one last night together. The only problem is, that the big secret his best friend Jon and his ex-girlfriend Jen have been keeping from him is revealed by their other friend, Moose. With only hours remaining, they must resolve their differences before Robbie leaves them, what may be for good.

== Cast ==
- Ben Kurland - Jon
- Karim Muasher - Moose
- Ina Marie Smith - Jen
- Vincent Versace - Robbie
- Holly Adams - Maria
- George Sapio - Wayne
- Wyeth Uhler - Young Jon
- Eli Bolton - Young Moose
- Troy Uhler - Young Robbie
- Joseph Versace - TV Debater (voice)

== Awards and nominations ==
- Won - First Prize, Best Short Film, 2006 Rhode Island Film Festival
- Nominated - Best Screenplay, 2006 Rhode Island Film Festival
