= Cavahirli =

- Location within Azerbaijan
- Coordinates: 40°07′21″N 46°58′53″E
- Country: Azerbaijan
- Rayon: Agdam
- Time zone: UTC+4 (AZT)

Cavahirli (Javanhirli) is a village in the Agdam District of Azerbaijan.

== History ==
The village was occupied by Armenian forces during the First Nagorno-Karabakh war and administrated as part of Martakert Province of the self-proclaimed Republic of Artsakh by the name Ջավագիրլի. The village was returned to Azerbaijan on 20 November 2020 per the 2020 Nagorno-Karabakh ceasefire agreement.
