= Hugh DeHaven =

American engineer (1895–1980)

Hugh DeHaven (3 March 1895 – 13 February 1980) was an American pilot, engineer and passive safety pioneer. DeHaven survived a plane crash while training as a Royal Canadian Flying Corps pilot during the First World War, and became interested in improving human survivability in vehicle crashes. He has been called the "Father of Crash Survivability".

== Early life ==
DeHaven was born in 1895 in Brooklyn, New York. His father was a steel worker and inventor. He attended Fessenden School in West Newton, Massachusetts from 1906 to 1909 before attending The Hill School in Pottstown, Pennsylvania from 1909 to 1914. Following graduation DeHaven attended Cornell University from 1914 to 1915, and Columbia University from 1915 to 1916. He tried to join the US Army Air Corps in 1916, but was rejected. He joined the Royal Flying Corps Canada in Toronto, Ontario, Canada.

While training as a pilot during the First World War, DeHaven survived a plane crash. While recuperating from a ruptured pancreas, he tried to understand why he, and only he, survived that crash, noting that his cockpit was the only one that remained intact.

== Early work ==
Hugh Robertson DeHaven was an inventor of long standing. Between 1924 and 1933 DeHaven filed seven patent applications related to his design of a self-sharpening single edge safety razor. Between approximately 1930 and 1936 his De Haven Razor Corporation marketed a number of different models based upon these designs. DeHaven himself retired in 1933.

In 1933, DeHaven survived a traffic accident which added to his interest in safety from his earlier airplane crash, and he began experimenting with crash testing using eggs.

In 1939, DeHaven recommended the use of helmets and seat belts at a 45° angle in airplanes. He created the inertial reel and the concept of the "delethalized" instrument panel.

== Crash Injury Research (CIR) ==
DeHaven rejoined Cornell in 1942 as a research associate and started the Cornell Crash Injury Research (CIR) program. Based on his work, DeHaven published the classic Mechanical analysis of survival in falls from heights of fifty to one hundred and fifty feet, concluding that:

The human body can tolerate and expend a force of two hundred times the force of gravity for brief intervals during which the force acts in transverse relation to the long axis of the body. It is reasonable to assume that structural provisions to reduce impact and distribute pressure can enhance survival and modify injury within wide limits in aircraft and automobile accidents.

In 1950, DeHaven published a report pointing to the second collision and the risk involved in vehicle ejection. He created the concept of "packaging" car occupants. He concluded: In 1953, the project split into two sub-projects, namely the Automobile Crash Injury Research (ACIR) and the Aviation Crash Injury Research (AvCIR) projects. Flight Safety Foundation takes over AvCIR (later Aviation Safety Engineering and Research (AvSER)), and continues the crash survival research started by DeHaven. AvSER is now part of Dynamic Science, Inc.

DeHaven was issued US 2710649 "Combination shoulder and lap safety belt" in 1955 for the first three-point seat belt.

== Quotes ==
We will get into anybody’s automobile, go any desired distance at dangerous speeds, without safety belts, without shoulder harness, and with a very minimum of padding or other protection to prevent our heads and bodies from smashing against the inside of a car in an accident. The level of safety which we accept for ourselves, our wives and our children is, therefore, on a par with shipping fragile valuable objects loose inside a container.

"...people knew more about protecting eggs in transit than they did about protecting human heads"

== See also ==
- Air safety
- Crashworthiness
