= Qızıloba, Aghdara =

Gyzyloba / Karmiravan Qızıloba / Կարմիրավան
- Location within Azerbaijan
- Coordinates: 40°15′39″N 46°56′26″E
- Country: Azerbaijan
- District: Aghdara
- Time zone: UTC+4 (AZT)

Gyzyloba (Azerbaijani: Qızıloba) or Karmiravan (Armenian: Կարմիրավան) is a village in the Aghdara District of Azerbaijan, in the disputed region of Nagorno-Karabakh. The village was on the ceasefire line between the armed forces of the breakaway Republic of Artsakh and those of Azerbaijan. There have been allegations of ceasefire violations in the village's vicinity. The village had an ethnic Armenian-majority population in 1989.

== History ==
During the Soviet period, the village was a part of the Mardakert District of the Nagorno-Karabakh Autonomous Oblast.
