= Yusifcanlı =

Yusifjanly
- Azerbaijani: Yusifcanlı
- Location within Azerbaijan
- Coordinates: 39°58′31″N 47°03′20″E
- Country: Azerbaijan
- District: Aghdam
- Time zone: UTC+4 (AZT)
  - Summer (DST): UTC+5 (AZT)

Yusifcanlı (Yusifjanly) is a village in the Aghdam District of Azerbaijan, 12 km south-east of Aghdam City, on the right bank of the old course of the Gargarchay river. The village is on the cease-fire line between the armed forces of the self-proclaimed Nagorno-Karabakh Republic and those of Azerbaijan. There have been allegations of cease fire violations in the village's vicinity.

== History ==
After the end of the armed conflict in Nagorno-Karabakh, a ceasefire declaration was signed, under the terms of which the entire Aghdam region was returned to Azerbaijan on November 20, 2020.
