= Fessenden School =

Private school in Massachusetts, US

Coordinates: 42°21′28.61″N 71°13′22.54″W

The Fessenden School
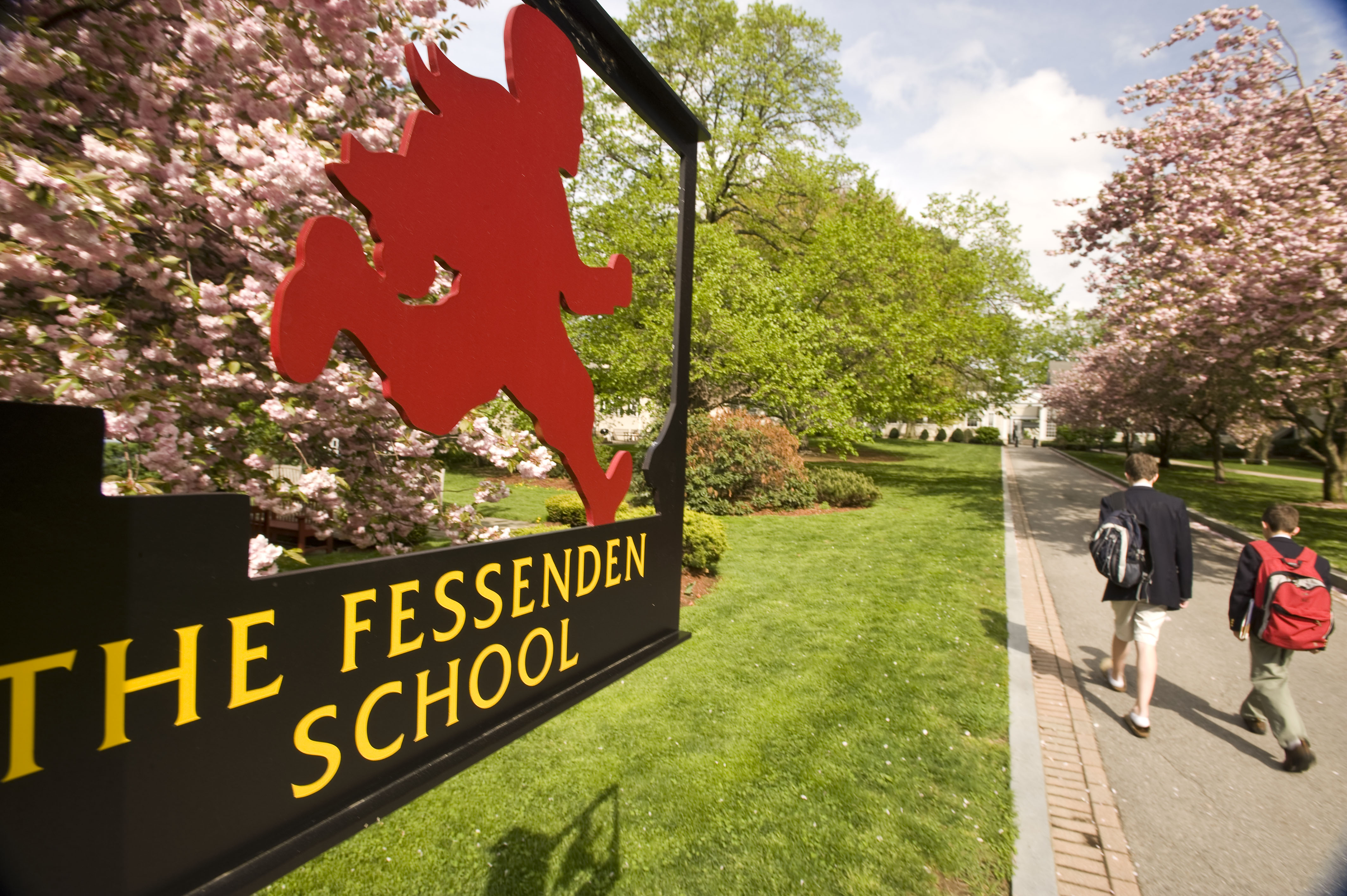
- United States

Information
- Type: Private boarding/day school
- Motto: Labor Omnia Vincit (Work conquers all)
- Established: September 1903
- School district: West Newton, Massachusetts
- Head of school: Steve Armstrong
- Faculty: 81
- Enrollment: 537
- Colors: Red and Gray
- Athletics: Yes
- Mascot: Bear
- Nickname: Fessy
- Website: The Fessenden School

The Fessenden School is an independent day (Pre-K – Grade 9) and boarding school (Grades 6 – 9) for boys, founded in 1903 by Frederick J. Fessenden as a school for the intellectually gifted, and located at 250 Waltham Street, West Newton, Massachusetts, United States, on a 41-acre (0.17 km^{2}) campus.

The former assistant headmaster; Arthur Clarridge was arrested in November 1977 for his involvement in a child sex ring operating out of Revere, Massachusetts. It was reported at the time that there had been no indication of the schools students being involved, however allegations surfaced more than 30 years later. The school posted a statement in 2011, acknowledged and apologizing for those that had been harmed by the sexual abuse that had occurred decades prior, and offered counseling for those affected. In 2014, attorney Mitchell Garabedian filed a lawsuit against the school seeking monetary damages for alleged sexual abuse that had occurred in the 1960-70s. In December 2017, a school administrator and former teacher was cleared of sexual misconduct by local police and the District Attorney following allegations from the 1990s.

== Notable alumni ==
- Lex Barker – American actor best known for playing Tarzan in Tarzan of the Apes.
- Hugh DeHaven – American professor at Cornell University and considered the "Father of Crash Survivability".
- James Franciscus – American actor who appeared in movies and television programs in the 1960s and 1970s.
- Edward Hallowell – Physician and international authority on attention deficit disorder.
- Howard R. Hughes – American aviator, industrialist and film producer/director. He attended the school in 1921.
- Porter Goss – Director of the Central Intelligence Agency from 2004 to 2006, United States Representative from Florida from 1989 to 2004.
- Sir Kenelm Guinness, 4th Baronet – British engineer and military officer
- Patrick J. Kennedy – former United States Representative from Rhode Island.
- Edward M. Kennedy – United States Senator from Massachusetts from 1962 to 2009.
- John Kerry – Former United States Secretary of State, Former United States Senator from Massachusetts and Democratic candidate for President of United States in 2004.
- Sol Kumin - Businessman, philanthropist and racehorse owner.
- Christopher Lloyd – Three-time Emmy Award-winning actor. Best known for the Back to the Future trilogy.
- Douglas Moore – Pulitzer Prize winner, Columbia music professor, and legendary figure in American Opera for works including The Ballad of Baby Doe, The Devil and Daniel Webster, and Giants of the Earth. Moore also wrote the school song "Song of Fessenden."
- Matt Nathanson, Singer-songwriter
- William Scranton – Governor of Pennsylvania from 1963 to 1967 and United States Ambassador to the United Nations from 1976 to 1977.
- Gerardo Torrado – Mexican soccer player who plays for Cruz Azul in the Primera División de México.
- Sheanon Williams – Member of the U20 U.S. national soccer team. Current member of MLS, Philadelphia Union
- Alex Oriakhi – Member of Erie BayHawks basketball team in the NBA Development League, former member of UConn Huskies, 2010–11 national champion and of the Missouri Tigers basketball team. He was drafted 57th overall by the Phoenix Suns in the 2013 NBA draft
- Charles Nesson – the William F. Weld Professor of Law at Harvard Law School
- Ben Kurland- an actor best known for his role in the Academy Award winning film The Artist.
