= Tuition Assistance Program =

Fjnacial aid program in New York, US

The Tuition Assistance Program is a financial aid program for students who are New York State residents and who are attending a post-secondary educational institution in New York. It is a program of the Higher Education Services Corporation which is a New York State Agency.

== Qualifications ==
The Tuition Assistance Program, better known as TAP, is an aid program that helps New York State residents going to college with their tuition. To become eligible for TAP, students must be United States citizens and New York State residents. With the TAP award, a student can earn from $500 to $5,000. Because TAP is a grant, the aid does not need to be repaid. There are several determining factors that influence how much aid students receive, such as family income and tax status (independent or dependent). Dependent students qualify for TAP if their family net tax income is below $80,000, and independent students who are married but have no parental income qualify if their income is below $40,000. Single independent students qualify for TAP if they have no parental income and their personal income is below $10,000. Other qualifications include number of college credits and grade point average for individuals who are already in school.

The Tuition Assistance Program is a part of a program called The Higher Education Services Corporation. The Higher Education Services program is a financial aid agency for college students. Tuition assistance is available for SUNY/CUNY colleges and can be used for tuition and fees for coursework related to students' majors. To apply for TAP, students can visit the financial aid website at FAFSA.gov. To apply students will first need the school name and code. If students are working part-time individuals can receive up to $1500, and if students are working full-time they can receive up to $3,000. If students are in school one must be a full-time student with at least a 2.0 average and taking 12 credits or more. Students will need to have a high school diploma and have graduated high school in the United States to be eligible for TAP. Also, according to the Higher Education Services Corporation, students must be charged at least $200 tuition per year.

Undergraduate students who enroll in bachelors programs can receive four years of TAP if they are studying full-time. If students do not fulfill the requirements for the tuition assistance then they can lose their funding and can be forced to repay the aid for that course. If a student is unable to keep up with credits or grades (for example, if a student's grade point average is below a C− with fewer than 12 credits) then the student can lose the assistance. Because TAP is a state program, some states have appeal programs, allowing participants to explain why they could not meet the requirements. Some states do not have the appeal process. If a student drops a class that TAP is paying for, the student may need to pay the full amount for that course. TAP is an award and it will appear on a student’s financial aid award letter from the school the student is attending or planning to attend and from the New York State higher service corporation (NYSHESC). The letter states how much aid students will be getting. Undergraduate students are limited to only 8 semesters to receive TAP.

If students are in the HEOP program, which is the Arthur O. Eve Higher Education Opportunity program, then they are able to receive TAP for 10 semesters. To receive TAP students have to be studying a specific major and in an approved degree program. Each year the deadline to complete a TAP form is June 30. After filling out a FAFSA application, the website will provide a link to the TAP homepage to fill the application. Students will acquire a user ID and a pin number to apply and make changes.

== Similar Programs ==
In addition to the federal government's Free Application for Student Aid (FAFSA), there are programs similar to TAP in other states. Each state has its own grant/scholarship program for college students. The qualifications in each program are the similar to TAP. Some examples of different state grant programs are California's Cal grant program, Cal Dream Act, and Georgia's HOPE grant program. Grants are also provided by the US Military. The military tuition assistance program is for students who are of a military family. The military tuition program helps to pay almost the full amount of a student’s tuition costs. The program pays semester hours that are $250 and less and only applies to active duty members.

== See also ==
- New York State Education Department
