= Sex Workers Anonymous =

Twelve-step program Los Angeles, California

Sex Workers Anonymous is a twelve-step program support group for those wanting to leave the sex industry, or recover from its effects. Originally known as Prostitutes Anonymous, it was founded by Jody Williams in August 1987 in Los Angeles, California. The group is open to all, regardless of gender, age, race, religion, or nationality. They have phone support, meetings, mail support, and a recovery book and step guide available. In 2025, they started using both names however because of the internet filters blocking these keywords. They do not take any stance on the sex industry itself, but only focus on providing exit support for those who want help no matter how they found themselves in some area of the commercial sex industry. They are in the process of expanding internationally. The founder is about to release her memoirs about her time in the industry as well as the years she's run this program/hotline.
