= MOWChIP-seq =

MOWChIP-seq (Microfluidic Oscillatory Washing–based Chromatin ImmunoPrecipitation followed by sequencing) is a microfluidic technology used in molecular biology for profiling genome-wide histone modifications and other molecular bindings using as few as 30-100 cells per assay. MOWChIP-seq is a special type of ChIP-seq assay designed for low-input and high-throughput assays. The overall process of MOWChIP-seq is similar to that of conventional ChIP-seq assay except that the chromatin immunoprecipitation (ChIP) and washing steps occur in a small microfluidic chamber. MOWChIP-seq takes advantage of the capability of microfluidics for manipulating micrometer-sized beads. In the process, a packed bed of beads is formed to drastically increase the adsorption efficiency of chromatin fragments. An automated oscillatory washing is then used to remove nonspecific binding and impurity from the bead surface. Initial version of MOWChIP device contained only one microfluidic chamber. In the more recent demonstration, semi-automated MOWChIP device for running 8 parallel assays was presented.

== Applications ==
MOWChIP-seq is enhanced and low-input ChIP-seq thus it applies to all molecular biology that can be probed using ChIP-seq. This includes analysis of histone modifications, RNA pol II binding, and transcription factor binding. Published MOWChIP-seq results include studies of various histone marks (H3K4me3, H3K27ac, H3K27me3, H3K9me3, H3K36me3, and H3K79me2)^{1,2}.

== Workflow of MOWChIP-seq ==
MOWChIP-seq requires a microfluidic system for running the ChIP and washing steps in a semi-automated fashion. The preparation of chromatin fragments from cells or nuclei and sequencing library using ChIP DNA is largely the same as in conventional ChIP-seq assays.

== Data analysis ==
MOWChIP-seq produces ChIP-seq data with high quality that is comparable to those produced using large quantity of cells. Thus the data analysis is mostly identical to the analytical processes used in common ChIP-seq data analysis.
