= H3T11P =

Epigenetic modification to the DNA packaging protein Histone H3

H3T11P is an epigenetic modification to the DNA packaging protein histone H3. It is a mark that indicates the phosphorylation the 11th threonine residue of the histone H3 protein.

Histone H3 phosphorylation at threonine 11 establishes a unique chromatin mark for transcriptional control. The levels of phosphorylated H3T11 are higher in prostate carcinomas as measured by Gleason scores.

H3T11P is a biomarker for aging and nutritional stress. Under stress, the Sch9 and CK2 kinases work together to regulate H3T11P. By changing dietary stress responses, H3pT11 mutants were able to extend their chronological longevity.

== Nomenclature ==
The name of this modification indicates the protein phosphorylation of threonine 11 on histone H3 protein subunit:

Abbr.	Meaning
H3	H3 family of histones
T	standard abbreviation for threonine
11	position of amino acid residue (counting from N-terminus)
P	phosphate group

== Serine/threonine/tyrosine phosphorylation ==
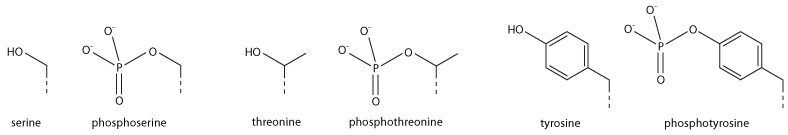

The addition of a negatively charged phosphate group can lead to major changes in protein structure, leading to the well-characterized role of phosphorylation in controlling protein function. It is not clear what structural implications histone phosphorylation has, but histone phosphorylation has clear functions as a post-translational modification.

== Clinical effect of modification ==
Protein-kinase-C-related kinase 1 (PRK1) phosphorylates histone H3 at threonine 11 when ligand-dependent recruitment to androgen receptor target genes occurs. The levels of PRK1 and phosphorylated H3T11 are higher in prostate carcinomas as measured by Gleason scores. PRK1 inhibition inhibits AR-induced tumor cell proliferation, making it a potential therapeutic target. The androgen receptor functions as a transcription factor in the genesis and progression of prostate cancer.

H3T11P is a biomarker for aging and nutritional stress. Under stress, the Sch9 and CK2 kinases work together to regulate H3T11P. By changing dietary stress responses, H3T11P mutants were able to extend their chronological longevity. The phosphorylation of H3T11 by Sch9 and CK2 links a nutritional stress response to chromatin in the regulation of lifespan. Loss of H3T11P prolongs lifespan by altering the stress response at an early stage.

== Histone modifications ==
The genomic DNA of eukaryotic cells is wrapped around special protein molecules known as histones. The complexes formed by the looping of the DNA are known as chromatin.

Post-translational modification of histones such as histone phosphorylation has been shown to modify the chromatin structure by changing protein:DNA or protein:protein interactions. Histone post-translational modifications modify the chromatin structure. The most commonly associated histone phosphorylation occurs during cellular responses to DNA damage, when phosphorylated histone H2A separates large chromatin domains around the site of DNA breakage. Researchers investigated whether modifications of histones directly impact RNA polymerase II directed transcription. Researchers choose proteins that are known to modify histones to test their effects on transcription, and found that the stress-induced kinase, MSK1, inhibits RNA synthesis. Inhibition of transcription by MSK1 was most sensitive when the template was in chromatin, since DNA templates not in chromatin were resistant to the effects of MSK1. It was shown that MSK1 phosphorylated histone H2A on serine 1, and mutation of serine 1 to alanine blocked the inhibition of transcription by MSK1. Thus results suggested that the acetylation of histones can stimulate transcription by suppressing an inhibitory phosphorylation by a kinase as MSK1.

== Mechanism and function of modification ==
Phosphorylation introduces a charged and hydrophilic group in the side chain of amino acids, possibly changing a protein's structure by altering interactions with nearby amino acids. Some proteins such as p53 contain multiple phosphorylation sites, facilitating complex, multi-level regulation. Because of the ease with which proteins can be phosphorylated and dephosphorylated, this type of modification is a flexible mechanism for cells to respond to external signals and environmental conditions.

Kinases phosphorylate proteins and phosphatases dephosphorylate proteins. Many enzymes and receptors are switched "on" or "off" by phosphorylation and dephosphorylation. Reversible phosphorylation results in a conformational change in the structure in many enzymes and receptors, causing them to become activated or deactivated. Phosphorylation usually occurs on serine, threonine, tyrosine and histidine residues in eukaryotic proteins. Histidine phosphorylation of eukaryotic proteins appears to be much more frequent than tyrosine phosphorylation. In prokaryotic proteins phosphorylation occurs on the serine, threonine, tyrosine, histidine or arginine or lysine residues. The addition of a phosphate (PO_{4}^{3-}) molecule to a non-polar R group of an amino acid residue can turn a hydrophobic portion of a protein into a polar and extremely hydrophilic portion of a molecule. In this way protein dynamics can induce a conformational change in the structure of the protein via long-range allostery with other hydrophobic and hydrophilic residues in the protein.

== Epigenetic implications ==
The post-translational modification of histone tails by either histone-modifying complexes or chromatin remodeling complexes is interpreted by the cell and leads to complex, combinatorial transcriptional output. It is thought that a histone code dictates the expression of genes by a complex interaction between the histones in a particular region. The current understanding and interpretation of histones comes from two large scale projects: ENCODE and the Epigenomic roadmap. The purpose of the epigenomic study was to investigate epigenetic changes across the entire genome. This led to chromatin states, which define genomic regions by grouping different proteins and/or histone modifications together. Chromatin states were investigated in Drosophila cells by looking at the binding location of proteins in the genome. Use of ChIP-sequencing revealed regions in the genome characterized by different banding. Different developmental stages were profiled in Drosophila as well, an emphasis was placed on histone modification relevance. A look in to the data obtained led to the definition of chromatin states based on histone modifications. Certain modifications were mapped and enrichment was seen to localize in certain genomic regions.

The human genome is annotated with chromatin states. These annotated states can be used as new ways to annotate a genome independently of the underlying genome sequence. This independence from the DNA sequence enforces the epigenetic nature of histone modifications. Chromatin states are also useful in identifying regulatory elements that have no defined sequence, such as enhancers. This additional level of annotation allows for a deeper understanding of cell specific gene regulation.

== Methods ==
The histone mark can be detected in a variety of ways:

1. Chromatin Immunoprecipitation Sequencing (ChIP-sequencing) measures the amount of DNA enrichment once bound to a targeted protein and immunoprecipitated. It results in good optimization and is used in vivo to reveal DNA-protein binding occurring in cells. ChIP-Seq can be used to identify and quantify various DNA fragments for different histone modifications along a genomic region.

2. Micrococcal Nuclease sequencing (MNase-seq) is used to investigate regions that are bound by well-positioned nucleosomes. Use of the micrococcal nuclease enzyme is employed to identify nucleosome positioning. Well-positioned nucleosomes are seen to have enrichment of sequences.

3. Assay for transposase accessible chromatin sequencing (ATAC-seq) is used to look in to regions that are nucleosome free (open chromatin). It uses hyperactive Tn5 transposon to highlight nucleosome localisation.
