= H4K8ac =

Histone acetylation on tail of histone H4

H4K8ac, representing an epigenetic modification to the DNA packaging protein histone H4, is a mark indicating the acetylation at the 8th lysine residue of the histone H4 protein. It has been implicated in the prevalence of malaria.

== Nomenclature ==
H4K8ac indicates acetylation of lysine 8 on histone H4 protein subunit:

Abbr.	Meaning
H4	H4 family of histones
K	standard abbreviation for lysine
8	position of amino acid residue (counting from N-terminus)
ac	acetyl group

== Histone modifications ==
The genomic DNA of eukaryotic cells is wrapped around special protein molecules known as histones. The complexes formed by the looping of the DNA are known as chromatin. The basic structural unit of chromatin is the nucleosome: this consists of the core octamer of histones (H2A, H2B, H3 and H4) as well as a linker histone and about 180 base pairs of DNA. These core histones are rich in lysine and arginine residues. The carboxyl (C) terminal end of these histones contribute to histone-histone interactions, as well as histone-DNA interactions. The amino (N) terminal charged tails are the site of the post-translational modifications, such as the one seen in H3K36me3.

=== H4 histone ===
H4 modifications are not as well known as H3's and H4 have fewer variations which might explain their important function.

=== H4K8ac ===
H4K8ac is part of 17 modifications of a group of active promoters. H4K8ac is found more often in active promoters and transcribed regions than other marks. H4K8ac is modified by a different group of enzymes than other H4 lysines.

== Lysine acetylation and deacetylation ==
Lysine acetylation

Proteins are typically acetylated on lysine residues and this reaction relies on acetyl-coenzyme A as the acetyl group donor. In histone acetylation and deacetylation, histone proteins are acetylated and deacetylated on lysine residues in the N-terminal tail as part of gene regulation. Typically, these reactions are catalyzed by enzymes with histone acetyltransferase (HAT) or histone deacetylase (HDAC) activity, although HATs and HDACs can modify the acetylation status of non-histone proteins as well.

The regulation of transcription factors, effector proteins, molecular chaperones, and cytoskeletal proteins by acetylation and deacetylation is a significant post-translational regulatory mechanism These regulatory mechanisms are analogous to phosphorylation and dephosphorylation by the action of kinases and phosphatases. Not only can the acetylation state of a protein modify its activity, but this post-translational modification may also crosstalk with phosphorylation, methylation, ubiquitination, sumoylation, and others for dynamic control of cellular signaling.

== Epigenetic implications ==
The post-translational modification of histone tails by either histone modifying complexes or chromatin remodeling complexes are interpreted by the cell and lead to complex, combinatorial transcriptional output. It is thought that a histone code dictates the expression of genes by a complex interaction between the histones in a particular region. The current understanding and interpretation of histones comes from two large scale projects: ENCODE and the Epigenomic roadmap. The purpose of the epigenomic study was to investigate epigenetic changes across the entire genome. This led to chromatin states which define genomic regions by grouping the interactions of different proteins and/or histone modifications together. Chromatin states were investigated in Drosophila cells by looking at the binding location of proteins in the genome. Use of ChIP-sequencing revealed regions in the genome characterised by different banding. Different developmental stages were profiled in Drosophila as well, an emphasis was placed on histone modification relevance. A look in to the data obtained led to the definition of chromatin states based on histone modifications.

The human genome was annotated with chromatin states. These annotated states can be used as new ways to annotate a genome independently of the underlying genome sequence. This independence from the DNA sequence enforces the epigenetic nature of histone modifications. Chromatin states are also useful in identifying regulatory elements that have no defined sequence, such as enhancers. This additional level of annotation allows for a deeper understanding of cell specific gene regulation.

== Methods ==
The histone mark acetylation can be detected in a variety of ways:

1. Chromatin Immunoprecipitation Sequencing (ChIP-sequencing) measures the amount of DNA enrichment once bound to a targeted protein and immunoprecipitated. It results in good optimization and is used in vivo to reveal DNA-protein binding occurring in cells. ChIP-Seq can be used to identify and quantify various DNA fragments for different histone modifications along a genomic region.

2. Micrococcal Nuclease sequencing (MNase-seq) is used to investigate regions that are bound by well positioned nucleosomes. Use of the micrococcal nuclease enzyme is employed to identify nucleosome positioning. Well positioned nucleosomes are seen to have enrichment of sequences.

3. Assay for transposase accessible chromatin sequencing (ATAC-seq) is used to look in to regions that are nucleosome free (open chromatin). It uses hyperactive Tn5 transposon to highlight nucleosome localisation.

== Clinical significance ==
This mark has been implicated in the prevalence of malaria.

== See also ==
- Histone acetylation
