= Cohen–Gibson syndrome =

Rare disorder linked to overgrowth and is characterized by dysmorphic facial features

Cohen-Gibson syndrome
- Cohen-Gibson syndrome is inherited in an autosomal dominant manner.

Cohen-Gibson syndrome is a disorder linked to overgrowth and is characterized by dysmorphic facial features and variable intellectual disability. Scoliosis and other features could include hypotonia, difficulty walking due to skeletal anomalies and umbilical hernia.

== Genetics ==
In some cases, a de novo missense mutation in EED was associated with decreased levels of H3K27me3 in comparison to wild type. This decrease was linked to loss of PRC2 activity.

== Diagnosis ==
The individuals clinical history or their past health examinations, a current physical examination to check for any physical abnormalities, and a genetic screening of the patients genes and the genealogy of the family are done.

== Epidemiology ==
This is a rare disease and its prevalence and incidence are unknown. It affects males and females equally. It has been reported at least four times in different racial demographics, once in a Turkish, Hispanic, Japanese and Caucasian patient.
