= Epigenetic code =

The epigenetic code is hypothesised to be a defining code in every eukaryotic cell consisting of the specific epigenetic modification in each cell. It consists of histone modifications defined by the histone code and additional epigenetic modifications such as DNA methylation. The base for the epigenetic code is a system above the genetic code of a single cell. While in one individual the genetic code in each cell is the same, the epigenetic code is tissue and cell specific. The epigenetic code can be multidimensional in nature. It could include any of the three major cellular macro-molecules: namely, DNA (code independent), RNA, and/or protein. In some ciliates potential structural codes have also been suggested.

== See also ==
- Histone code
- Epigenetics
- DNA methylation
