= EZH inhibitory protein =

Protein-coding gene in humans

EZHIP

Identifiers
- Aliases: EZHIP, chromosome X open reading frame 67, CXorf67, EZH inhibitory protein, KIP75, CATACOMB
- External IDs: GeneCards: EZHIP

Gene location (Human)
Chr.	X chromosome (human)
Band	Xp11.22	Start	51,406,948 bp
Band	Xp11.22	End	51,408,843 bp
RNA expression pattern
Bgee	Human / Mouse (ortholog); Top expressed in: secondary oocyte; gonad; testicle; right testis; left testis; placenta; cerebellar hemisphere; right hemisphere of cerebellum; granulocyte; pituitary gland / n/a; More reference expression data
BioGPS	n/a
Orthologs
Databases	NCBI: entry; OMA: entry
Species	Human	Mouse
Entrez	340602	n/a
Ensembl	ENSG00000187690	n/a
UniProt	Q86X51	n/a
RefSeq (mRNA)	NM_203407	n/a
RefSeq (protein)	NP_981952	n/a
Location (UCSC)	Chr X: 51.41 – 51.41 Mb	n/a
PubMed search		n/a
- Wikidata
View/Edit Human

EZH inhibitory protein is a protein that in humans is encoded by the gene EZHIP (previously CXorf67). As its name suggests, EZH inhibitory protein functions to inhibit methyltransferase activity of the enzymes EZH1 and EZH2. By extension, this inhibits the function of the PRC2-EZH1 and PRC2-EZH2 complexes, leading to a reduction in the Trimethylation of H3 lysine 27.

== Expression ==
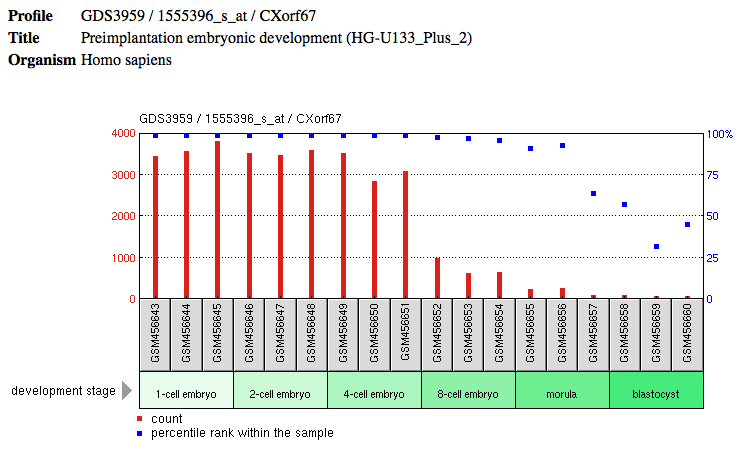
"Expression of EZHIP during human preimplantation embryonic development"

Expression of EZHIP in humans is generally low in all tissues. Higher RNA expression has been reported in the testis and placenta and relatively higher nuclear protein expression has been observed in the placenta, testis and ovarian follicles.

== Interactions ==
Protein interaction of EZHIP with UBC (polyubiquitin-C) in humans was identified using a two-hybrid screening.

== Associations with disease ==
The fusion of EZHIP with the MBTD1 gene has been linked to low-grade endometrial stromal sarcoma in humans.
