= H3K4 =

H3K4 is the fourth lysine residue on DNA packaging protein Histone H3. It can be marked by epigenetic modification by different amounts of methylation.

Modifications include:

- H3K4me1
- H3K4me2
- H3K4me3
