= KMT2B =

Protein-coding gene in the species Homo sapiens

Identifiers
- Aliases: KMT2B, HRX2, MLL1B, MLL2, MLL4, TRX2, WBP-7, WBP7, CXXC10, lysine methyltransferase 2B, DYT28
- External IDs: OMIM: 606834; MGI: 109565; GeneCards: KMT2B
Available structures
PDB	Ortholog search: PDBe RCSB
PDB	List of PDB id codes 3UVM, 4ERZ, 4PZI
Enzyme activity
EC #	BRENDA	ExPASy	KEGG	MetaCyc
2.1.1.364	↗	↗	↗	↗

Gene location (Human)
Chr.	Chromosome 19 (human)
Band	19q13.12	Start	35,717,973 bp
Band	19q13.12	End	35,738,880 bp

Gene location (Mouse)
Chr.	Chromosome 7 (mouse)
Band	7|7 B1	Start	30,268,283 bp
Band	7|7 B1	End	30,288,151 bp
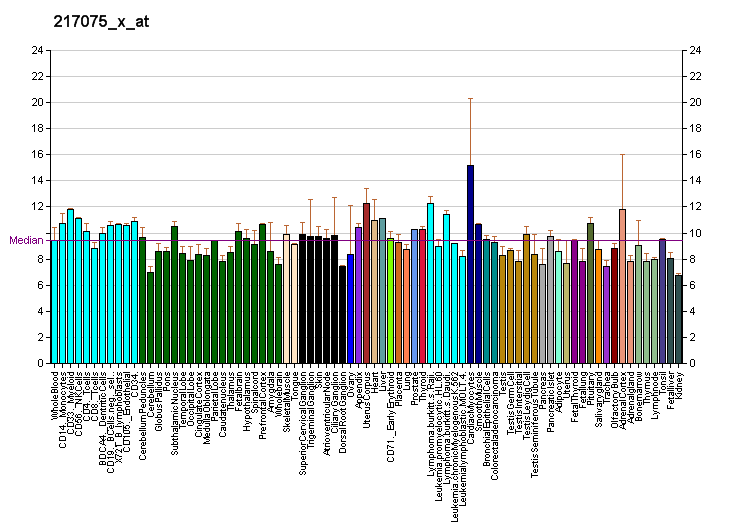

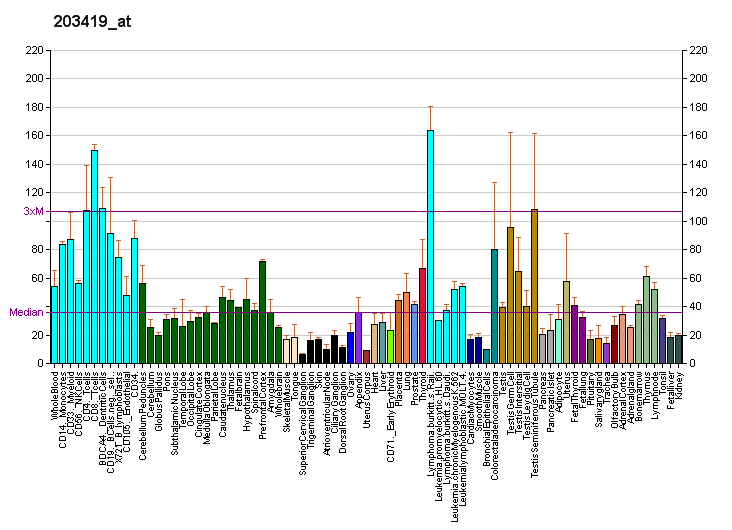
RNA expression pattern
Bgee	Human / Mouse (ortholog); Top expressed in: right testis; left testis; right hemisphere of cerebellum; anterior pituitary; granulocyte; skin of leg; right lobe of thyroid gland; skin of abdomen; left lobe of thyroid gland; gastric mucosa / Top expressed in: secondary oocyte; genital tubercle; tail of embryo; zygote; hand; neural layer of retina; otic vesicle; mesenteric lymph nodes; granulocyte; ventricular zone; More reference expression data
BioGPS	More reference expression data
Gene ontology
Molecular function	methyltransferase activity; transferase activity; DNA binding; DNA-binding transcription factor activity; zinc ion binding; metal ion binding; protein binding; histone-lysine N-methyltransferase activity; histone methyltransferase activity (H3-K4 specific); DNA-binding transcription factor activity, RNA polymerase II-specific
Cellular component	nucleoplasm; nucleus; histone methyltransferase complex
Biological process	regulation of transcription, DNA-templated; histone H3-K4 trimethylation; regulation of histone H3-K4 methylation; memory; transcription, DNA-templated; methylation; ovarian follicle development; histone lysine methylation; ovulation; oocyte differentiation; histone H3-K4 methylation; regulation of megakaryocyte differentiation; chromatin organization; regulation of transcription by RNA polymerase II; positive regulation of transcription, DNA-templated
Sources:Amigo / QuickGO
Orthologs
Databases	NCBI: entry; OMA: entry
Species	Human	Mouse
Entrez	9757	75410
Ensembl	ENSG00000272333	ENSMUSG00000006307
UniProt	Q9UMN6	O08550
RefSeq (mRNA)	NM_014727	NM_001290573; NM_029274
RefSeq (protein)	NP_055542	NP_001277502; NP_083550
Location (UCSC)	Chr 19: 35.72 – 35.74 Mb	Chr 7: 30.27 – 30.29 Mb
PubMed search
- Wikidata
View/Edit Human	View/Edit Mouse

Histone-lysine N-methyltransferase 2B is a protein that in humans is encoded by the KMT2B gene.

This gene encodes a protein which contains multiple domains including a CXXC zinc finger, three PHD zinc fingers, two FY-rich domains, and a SET (suppressor of variegation, enhancer of zeste, and trithorax) domain. The SET domain is a conserved C-terminal domain that characterizes proteins of the MLL (mixed-lineage leukemia) family. This gene is ubiquitously expressed in adult tissues. It is also amplified in solid tumor cell lines, and may be involved in human cancer. Two alternatively spliced transcript variants encoding distinct isoforms have been reported for this gene, however, the full length nature of the shorter transcript is not known.
