= H3K27me3 =

Epigenitic modification to the protein histone H3

H3K27me3 is an epigenetic modification to the DNA packaging protein histone H3. It is a mark that indicates the tri-methylation of lysine 27 on histone H3 protein.

This tri-methylation is associated with the downregulation of nearby genes via the formation of heterochromatic regions.

== Nomenclature ==
H3K27me3 indicates trimethylation of lysine 27 on histone H3 protein subunit:

| Abbr. | Meaning |
| H3 | H3 family of histones |
| K | standard abbreviation for lysine |
| 27 | position of amino acid residue (counting from N-terminus) |
| me | methyl group |
| 3 | number of methyl groups added |

== Lysine methylation ==

This diagram shows the progressive methylation of a lysine residue. The tri-methylation (right) denotes the methylation present in H3K27me3.

== Understanding histone modifications ==
The genomic DNA of eukaryotic cells is wrapped around special protein molecules known as histones. The complexes formed by the looping of the DNA are known as chromatin. The basic structural unit of chromatin is the nucleosome: this consists of the core octamer of histones (H2A, H2B, H3 and H4) as well as a linker histone and about 180 base pairs of DNA. These core histones are rich in lysine and arginine residues. The carboxyl (C) terminal end of these histones contribute to histone-histone interactions, as well as histone-DNA interactions. The amino (N) terminal charged tails are the site of the post-translational modifications, such as the one seen in H3K27me3.

== Mechanism and function of modification ==
The placement of a repressive mark on lysine 27 requires the recruitment of chromatin regulators by transcription factors. These modifiers are either histone modification complexes which covalently modify the histones to move around the nucleosomes and open the chromatin, or chromatin remodelling complexes which involve movement of the nucleosomes without directly modifying them. These histone marks can serve as docking sites of other co-activators as seen with H3K27me3. This occurs through polycomb mediated gene silencing via histone methylation and chromodomain interactions. A polycomb repressive complex (PRC); PRC2, mediates the tri-methylation of histone 3 on lysine 27 through histone methyl transferase activity. This mark can recruit PRC1 which will bind and contribute to the compaction of the chromatin.

The inflammatory transcription factor NF-κB can cause demethylation of H3K27me3 via Jmjd3.

H3K27me3 is linked to the repair of DNA damages, particularly repair of double-strand breaks by homologous recombinational repair.

== Relationship with other modification ==
H3K27 can undergo a variety of other modifications. It can exist in mono- as well as di-methylated states. The roles of these respective modifications are not as well characterised as tri-methylation. PRC2 is however believed to be implicated in all the different methylations associated with H3K27me.

H3K27me1 is linked to promotion of transcription and is seen to accumulate in transcribed genes. Histone-histone interactions play a role in this process. Regulation occurs via Setd2-dependent H3K36me3 deposition.

H3K27me2 is broadly distributed within the core histone H3 and is believed to play a protective role by inhibiting non-cell-type specific enhancers. Ultimately, this leads to the inactivation of transcription.

Acetylation is usually linked to the upregulation of genes. This is the case in H3K27ac which is an active enhancer mark. It is found in distal and proximal regions of genes. It is enriched in transcriptional start sites (TSS). H3K27ac shares a location with H3K27me3 and they interact in an antagonistic manner.

H3K27me3 is often seen to interact with H3K4me3 in bivalent domains . These domains are usually found in embryonic stem cells and are pivotal for proper cell differentiation. H3K27me3 and H3K4me3 determine whether a cell will remain unspecified or will eventually differentiate. The Grb10 gene in mice makes use of these bivalent domains. Grb10 displays imprinted gene expression. Genes are expressed from one parental allele while simultaneously being silenced in the other parental allele. Demethylation of H3K27me3 can lead to up-regulation of genes controlling the senescence-associated secretory phenotype (SASP).

Other well characterised modifications are H3K9me3 as well as H4K20me3 which—just like H3K27me3—are linked to transcriptional repression via formation of heterochromatic regions. Mono-methylations of H3K27, H3K9, and H4K20 are all associated with gene activation.

== Epigenetic implications ==
The post-translational modification of histone tails by either histone modifying complexes or chromatin remodelling complexes are interpreted by the cell and lead to complex, combinatorial transcriptional output. It is thought that a histone code dictates the expression of genes by a complex interaction between the histones in a particular region. The current understanding and interpretation of histones comes from two large scale projects: ENCODE and the Epigenomic roadmap. The purpose of the epigenomic study was to investigate epigenetic changes across the entire genome. This led to chromatin states which define genomic regions by grouping the interactions of different proteins and/or histone modifications together. Chromatin states were investigated in Drosophila cells by looking at the binding location of proteins in the genome. Use of ChIP sequencing revealed regions in the genome characterised by different banding. Different developmental stages were profiled in Drosophila as well, an emphasis was placed on histone modification relevance. A look in to the data obtained led to the definition of chromatin states based on histone modifications. Certain modifications were mapped and enrichment was seen to localize in certain genomic regions. Five core histone modifications were found with each respective one being linked to various cell functions.

- H3K4me3-promoters
- H3K4me1- primed enhancers
- H3K36me3-gene bodies
- H3K27me3-polycomb repression
- H3K9me3-heterochromatin

The human genome was annotated with chromatin states. These annotated states can be used as new ways to annotate a genome independently of the underlying genome sequence. This independence from the DNA sequence enforces the epigenetic nature of histone modifications. Chromatin states are also useful in identifying regulatory elements that have no defined sequence, such as enhancers. This additional level of annotation allows for a deeper understanding of cell specific gene regulation.

Cause-and-effect relationship between sperm-transmitted histone marks and gene expression and development is in offspring and grandoffspring.

== Clinical significance ==
H3K27me3 is believed to be implicated in some diseases due to its regulation as a repressive mark.

=== Cohen–Gibson syndrome ===
Cohen–Gibson syndrome is a disorder linked to overgrowth and is characterised by dysmorphic facial features and variable intellectual disability. In some cases, a de novo missense mutation in EED was associated with decreased levels of H3K27me3 in comparison to wild type. This decrease was linked to loss of PRC2 activity.

=== Diffuse midline Glioma ===
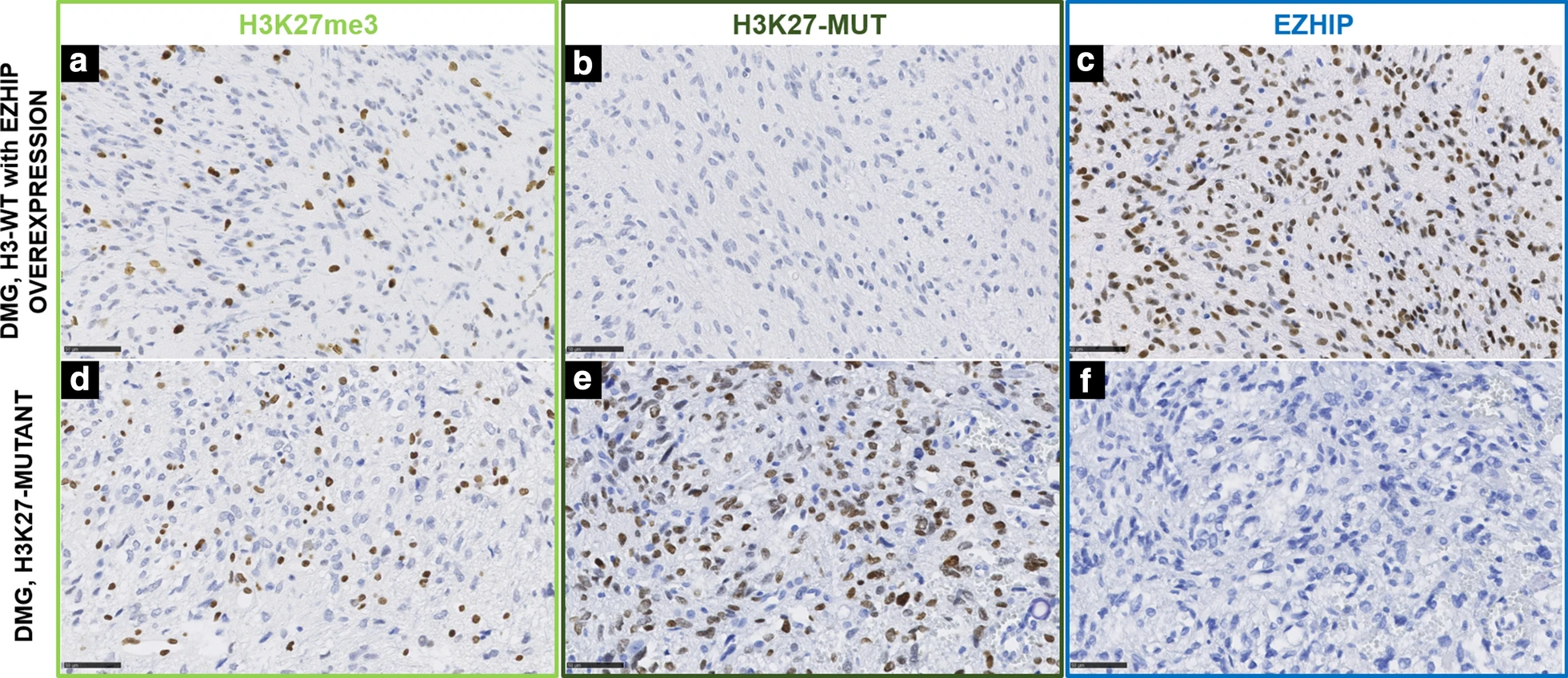
Immunohistochemical comparison of DMG with EHZIP overexpression (top) to DMG with H3K27M mutation (bottom). Loss of M3K27me3 (left) is visible in both samples, while H3K27M (middle) and EZHIP (right) only stain in one of the samples, respectively.

Diffuse midline glioma, H3K27me3-altered (DMG), also known as diffuse intrinsic pontine glioma (DIPG) is a type of highly aggressive brain tumor mostly found in children. All DMGs exhibit loss of H3K27me3, in about 80% of cases due to a genetic mutation receplacing lysine with methionine (M), known as H3K27M. In rare forms, H3Kme3-loss is mediated by overexpression of the EZH inhibitory protein, decreasing PRC2-activity.

=== Spectrum disorders ===
There is evidence that implicates the downregulation of expression of H3K27me3 in conjunction with differential expression of H3K4me3 AND DNA methylation may play a factor in fetal alcohol spectrum disorder (FASD) in C57BL/6J mice. This histone code is believed to affect the peroxisome associated pathway and induce the loss of the peroxisomes to ameliorate oxidative stress.

== Methods ==
The histone mark H3K27me3 can be detected in a variety of ways:

1. Chromatin Immunoprecipitation Sequencing (ChIP sequencing) measures the amount of DNA enrichment once bound to a targeted protein and immunoprecipitated. It results in good optimization and is used in vivo to reveal DNA-protein binding occurring in cells. ChIP-Seq can be used to identify and quantify various DNA fragments for different histone modifications along a genomic region.

2. Micrococcal Nuclease sequencing (MNase-seq) is used to investigate regions that are bound by well positioned nucleosomes. Use of the micrococcal nuclease enzyme is employed to identify nucleosome positioning. Well positioned nucleosomes are seen to have enrichment of sequences.

3. Assay for transposase accessible chromatin sequencing (ATAC-seq) is used to look in to regions that are nucleosome free (open chromatin). It uses hyperactive Tn5 transposon to highlight nucleosome localisation.

== See also ==
- Histone methylation
- Histone methyltransferase
  - SET domain-containing lysine-specific
- Methyllysine
- JARID1B, an enzyme which can reverse the methylation
- Bivalent chromatin, where this repressing modification is often used with activator H3K4me3
