= Histone code =

Proposed biochemical transcription of genetic information

The histone code is a hypothesis that the transcription of genetic information encoded in DNA is in part regulated by chemical modifications (known as histone marks) to histone proteins, primarily on their unstructured ends. Together with similar modifications such as DNA methylation it is part of the epigenetic code. Histones associate with DNA to form nucleosomes, which themselves bundle to form chromatin fibers, which in turn make up the more familiar chromosome. Histones are globular proteins with a flexible N-terminus (taken to be the tail) that protrudes from the nucleosome. Many of the histone tail modifications correlate very well to chromatin structure and both histone modification state and chromatin structure correlate well to gene expression levels. The critical concept of the histone code hypothesis is that the histone modifications serve to recruit other proteins by specific recognition of the modified histone via protein domains specialized for such purposes, rather than through simply stabilizing or destabilizing the interaction between histone and the underlying DNA. These recruited proteins then act to alter chromatin structure actively or to promote transcription. For details of gene expression regulation by histone modifications see table below.

== The hypothesis ==
The hypothesis is that chromatin-DNA interactions are guided by combinations of histone modifications. While it is accepted that modifications (such as methylation, acetylation, ADP-ribosylation, ubiquitination, citrullination, SUMO-ylation and phosphorylation) to histone tails alter chromatin structure, a complete understanding of the precise mechanisms by which these alterations to histone tails influence DNA-histone interactions remains elusive. However, some specific examples have been worked out in detail. For example, phosphorylation of serine residues 10 and 28 on histone H3 is a marker for chromosomal condensation. Similarly, the combination of phosphorylation of serine residue 10 and acetylation of a lysine residue 14 on histone H3 is a tell-tale sign of active transcription.

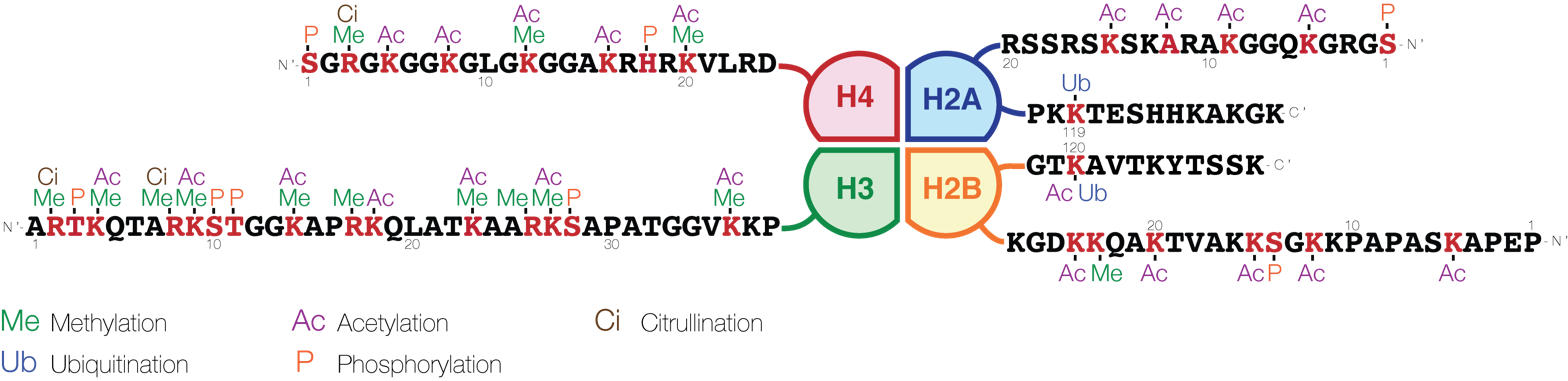
Schematic representation of histone modifications. Based on Rodriguez-Paredes and Esteller, Nature, 2011

=== Modifications ===
Well characterized modifications to histones include:

- Methylation: Both lysine and arginine residues are known to be methylated. Methylated lysines are the best understood marks of the histone code, as specific methylated lysine match well with gene expression states. Methylation of lysines H3K4 and H3K36 is correlated with transcriptional activation while demethylation of H3K4 is correlated with silencing of the genomic region. Methylation of lysines H3K9 and H3K27 is correlated with transcriptional repression. Particularly, H3K9me3 is highly correlated with constitutive heterochromatin. Methylation of histone lysine also has a role in DNA repair. For instance, H3K36me3 is required for homologous recombinational repair of DNA double-strand breaks, and H4K20me2 facilitates repair of such breaks by non-homologous end joining.
- Acetylation—by HAT (histone acetyl transferase); deacetylation—by HDAC (histone deacetylase): Acetylation tends to define the 'openness' of chromatin as acetylated histones cannot pack as well together as deacetylated histones.
- Phosphorylation
- Ubiquitination
- SUMOylation

However, there are many more histone modifications, and sensitive mass spectrometry approaches have recently greatly expanded the catalog. As of March 2026, over 300 post-translational modifications and over 200 histone proteoforms (i.e. the unique pattern of modifications found on an individual histone protein) have been identified. These modification patterns are dynamic and change in response to the cell cycle progression, disease states, diet, and environmental stimuli. Despite some known examples of crosstalk, the full extent of interactions within and between histone proteoforms remains poorly understood.

A very basic summary of the histone code for gene expression status is given below (histone nomenclature is described here):

Type of modification	Histone							
Type of modification	H3K4	H3K9	H3K14	H3K27	H3K79	H3K122	H4K20	H2BK5
mono-methylation	activation	activation		activation	activation		activation	activation
di-methylation		repression		repression	activation			
tri-methylation	activation	repression		repression	activation, repression			repression
acetylation		activation	activation	activation		activation		

==== Histone H2B ====
- H2BK5ac

==== Histone H3 ====
- H3K4me1 - primed enhancers
- H3K4me3 is enriched in transcriptionally active promoters.
- H3K9me2 -repression
- H3K9me3 is found in constitutively repressed genes.
- H3K27me3 is found in facultatively repressed genes.
- H3K36me
- H3K36me2
- H3K36me3 is found in actively transcribed gene bodies.
- H3K79me2
- H3K9ac is found in actively transcribed promoters.
- H3K14ac is found in actively transcribed promoters.
- H3K23ac
- H3K27ac distinguishes active enhancers from poised enhancers.
- H3K36ac
- H3K56ac is a proxy for de novo histone assembly.
- H3K122ac is enriched in poised promoters and also found in a different type of putative enhancer that lacks H3K27ac.
- H3Q5dop
- H3Q5ser appears to regulate neural transcription
- H3R42me

==== Histone H4 ====
- H4K5ac
- H4K8ac
- H4K12ac
- H4K16ac
- H4K20me
- H4K91ac

=== Crosstalk ===
Combinations of histone modifications collectively influence chromatin structure and gene expression. Examples for the complexities of this epigenetic regulatory mechanism are:

Acetylation and phosphorylation: in mouse 10T1/2 cells phosphorylation of histone H3S10 or H3T11 promotes acetylation on histone H3K9 and H3K14 by recruiting the histone lysine acetyltransferase 2 A (KAT2A) which promotes gene transcription. In yeast, histone H3S10ph, in the presence of histone H4K16ac, recruits the histone deacetylase Hst2p, which removes the acetyl group at H4K16ac and thereby promotes chromatin condensation. These examples illustrate how crosstalk can yield opposing outcomes depending on context.

Methylation and ubiquitination: while histone H3K4me3 is generally associated with transcriptional activation, mono-ubiquitination of histone H2A can inhibit the transition from H3K4me2 to H3K4me3 within the same nucleosome, thereby repressing transcription.

Phosphorylation and methylation: histone H3K9me3 recruits heterochromatin protein 1 (HP1) to establish transcriptionally repressive heterochromatin, but phosphorylation at histone H3S10 occurring adjacent to H3K9me3 significantly reduces HP1 affinity for H3K9me3.

Methylation and acetylation: histone H3 can undergo acetylation or methylation at positions K9, K27, and K36 and histones frequently harbor a mix of methylation and acetylation. The interaction between BPTF (Bromodomain PHD finger transcription factor) and nucleosomes was significantly enhanced when acetylation was present alongside methylation on the same histone protein (specifically H3K4me3K14ac or H3K4me3K18ac).

Citrullination and methylation: Citrullination of H3R26 by PAD2 and methylation of H3K27 by PRC2 have opposing downstream impacts on gene regulation; H3R26 citrullination activates gene expression and H3K27 methylation represses gene expression. Methylation of H3K27 slows citrullination of H3R26 30-fold, whereas citrullination of H3R26 slows methylation 30,000-fold.

== Complexity ==
Unlike this simplified model, any real histone code has the potential to be massively complex; each of the four standard histones can be simultaneously modified at multiple different sites with multiple different modifications. To give an idea of this complexity, histone H3 contains nineteen lysines known to be methylated—each can be un-, mono-, di- or tri-methylated. If modifications are independent, this allows a potential 4^{19} or 280 billion different lysine methylation patterns, far more than the maximum number of histones in a human genome (6.4 Gb / ~150 bp = ~44 million histones if they are very tightly packed). And this does not include lysine acetylation (known for H3 at nine residues), arginine methylation (known for H3 at three residues) or threonine/serine/tyrosine phosphorylation (known for H3 at eight residues), not to mention modifications of other histones.

Every nucleosome in a cell can therefore have a different set of modifications, raising the question of whether common patterns of histone modifications exist. A study of about 40 histone modifications across human gene promoters found over 4000 different combinations used, over 3000 occurring at only a single promoter. However, patterns were discovered including a set of 17 histone modifications that are present together at over 3000 genes. Mass spectrometry-based top-down proteomics has provided more insight into these patterns by being able to discriminate single molecule co-occurrence from co-localization in the genome or on the same nucleosome. A variety of approaches have been used to delve into detailed biochemical mechanisms that demonstrate the importance of interplay between histone modifications. Thus, specific patterns of histone modifications are more common than others. These patterns are functionally important but they are intricate and challenging to study. We currently have the best biochemical understanding of the importance of a relatively small number of discrete modifications and a few combinations.

Structural determinants of histone recognition by readers, writers, and erasers of the histone code are revealed by a growing body of experimental data.

== See also ==
- Histone
- Histone-modifying enzymes
