= Methyllysine =

Derivative of the amino acid residue lysine

Methyllysine is derivative of the amino acid residue lysine where the sidechain ammonium group has been methylated one or more times.

Such methylated lysines play an important role in epigenetics; the methylation of specific lysines of certain histones in a nucleosome alters the binding of the surrounding DNA to those histones, which in turn affects the expression of genes on that DNA. The binding is affected because the effective radius of the positive charge is increased (methyl groups are larger than the hydrogen atoms they replace), reducing the strongest potential electrostatic attraction with the negatively charged DNA.

It is thought that the methylation of lysine (and arginine) on histone tails does not directly affect their binding to DNA. Rather, such methyl marks recruit other proteins that modulate chromatin structure.

In Protein Data Bank files, methylated lysines are indicated by the MLY or MLZ acronyms.

Unmethylated lysine

Monomethylated: 6-N-methyllysine

Dimethylated: (6-N,6-N)dimethyllysine

Trimethylated: (6-N,6-N,6-N)trimethyllysine
