= Transposase =

Enzyme that catalyzes movement of transposable elements

A transposase is any of a class of enzymes capable of binding to the end of a transposon and catalysing its movement to another part of a genome, typically by a cut-and-paste mechanism or a replicative mechanism, in a process known as transposition. The word "transposase" was coined by the individuals who cloned the enzyme required for transposition of the Tn3 transposon. The existence of transposons was postulated in the late 1940s by Barbara McClintock, who was studying the inheritance of maize, but the actual molecular basis for transposition was described by later groups. McClintock discovered that some segments of chromosomes changed their position, jumping between different loci or from one chromosome to another. The repositioning of these transposons (which coded for color) allowed other genes for pigment to be expressed. Transposition in maize causes changes in color; however, in other organisms, such as bacteria, it can cause antibiotic resistance. Transposition is also important in creating genetic diversity within species and generating adaptability to changing living conditions.

Transposases are classified under EC number EC 2.7.7. Genes encoding transposases are widespread in the genomes of most organisms and are the most abundant genes known. During the course of human evolution, as much as 40% of the human genome has moved around via methods such as transposition of transposons.

== Transposase Tn5 ==
Transposase Tn5 dimerisation domain
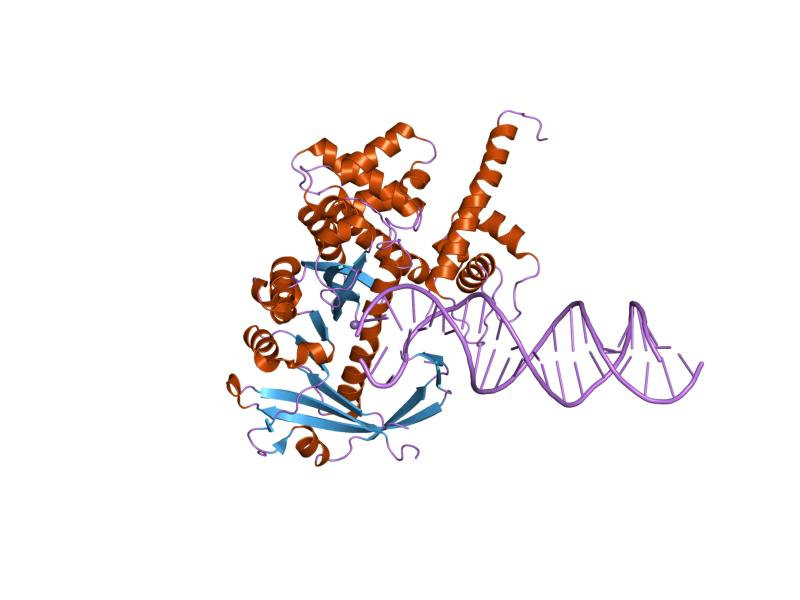
- tn5 transposase: 20mer outside end 2 mn complex

Identifiers
- Symbol: Dimer_Tnp_Tn5
- Pfam: PF02281
- InterPro: IPR003201
- SCOP2: 1b7e / SCOPe / SUPFAM
Available protein structures:
- PDB: IPR003201 PF02281 (ECOD; PDBsum)
- AlphaFold: IPR003201; PF02281

Transposase (Tnp) Tn5 is a member of the RNase superfamily of proteins which includes retroviral integrases. Tn5 can be found in Shewanella and Escherichia bacteria. The transposon codes for antibiotic resistance to kanamycin and other aminoglycoside antibiotics.

Tn5 and other transposases are notably inactive. Because DNA transposition events are inherently mutagenic, the low activity of transposases is necessary to reduce the risk of causing a fatal mutation in the host, and thus eliminating the transposable element. One of the reasons Tn5 is so unreactive is because the N- and C-termini are located in relatively close proximity to one another and tend to inhibit each other. This was elucidated by the characterization of several mutations which resulted in hyperactive forms of transposases. One such mutation, L372P, is a mutation of amino acid 372 in the Tn5 transposase. This amino acid is generally a leucine residue in the middle of an alpha helix. When this leucine is replaced with a proline residue the alpha helix is broken, introducing a conformational change to the C-terminal domain, separating it from the N-terminal domain enough to promote higher activity of the protein. The transposition of a transposon often needs only three pieces: the transposon, the transposase enzyme, and the target DNA for the insertion of the transposon. This is the case with Tn5, which uses a cut-and-paste mechanism for moving around transposons.

Tn5 and most other transposases contain a DDE motif, which is the active site that catalyzes the movement of the transposon. Aspartate-97, aspartate-188, and glutamate-326 make up the active site, which is a triad of acidic residues. The DDE motif is said to coordinate divalent metal ions, most often magnesium and manganese, which are important in the catalytic reaction. Because transposase is incredibly inactive, the DDE region is mutated so that the transposase becomes hyperactive and catalyzes the movement of the transposon. The glutamate is transformed into an aspartate and the two aspartates into glutamates. Through this mutation, the study of Tn5 becomes possible, but some steps in the catalytic process are lost as a result.

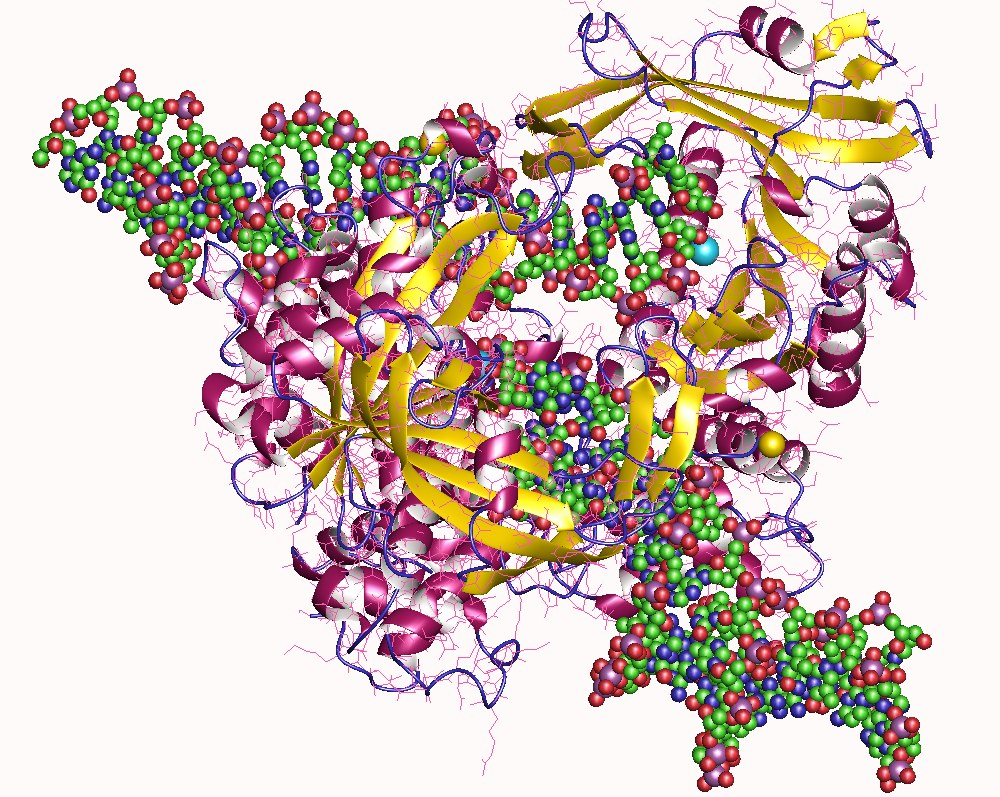

There are several steps which catalyze the movement of the transposon, including Tnp binding, synapsis (the creation of a synaptic complex), cleavage, target capture, and strand transfer. Transposase then binds to the DNA strand and creates a clamp over the transposon end of the DNA and inserts into the active site. Once the transposase binds to the transposon, it produces a synaptic complex in which two transposases are bound in a cis/trans relationship with the transposon.

In cleavage, the magnesium ions activate oxygen from water molecules and expose them to nucleophilic attack. This allows the water molecules to nick the 3' strands on both ends and create a hairpin formation, which separates the transposon from the donor DNA. Next, the transposase moves the transposon to a suitable location. Not much is known about the target capture, although there is a sequence bias which has not yet been determined. After target capture, the transposase attacks the target DNA nine base pairs apart, resulting in the integration of the transposon into the target DNA.

As mentioned before, due to the mutations of the DDE, some steps of the process are lost—for example, when this experiment is performed in vitro, and SDS heat treatment denatures the transposase. However, it is still uncertain what happens to the transposase in vivo.

The study of transposase Tn5 is of general importance because of its similarities to HIV-1 and other retroviral diseases. By studying Tn5, much can also be discovered about other transposases and their activities.

Tn5 is utilized in genome sequencing by using the Tn5 to append sequencing adaptors and fragment the DNA in a single enzymatic reaction in 2010, reducing the time and input requirements over traditional next-generation sequencing library preparation. The Tn5-based strategy can simplify the library preparation protocol significantly and can even be incorporated into the direct colony-PCR for large numbers of bacterial isolates with no obvious coverage bias. The main disadvantages are less control of fragmented size compared to enzymatic fragmentation and mechanical fragmentation, and a bias toward high G-C content. This means of library preparation is also used in the ATAC-seq technique.

== Sleeping Beauty transposase ==
The Sleeping Beauty (SB) transposase is the recombinase that drives the Sleeping Beauty transposon system. SB transposase belongs to the DD[E/D] family of transposases, which in turn belong to a large superfamily of polynucleotidyl transferases that includes RNase H, RuvC Holliday resolvase, RAG proteins, and retroviral integrases. The SB system is used primarily in vertebrate animals for gene transfer, including gene therapy, and gene discovery. The engineered SB100X is an enzyme that directs the high levels of transposon integration.

== Tn7 transposon ==
The Tn7 transposon is a mobile genetic element found in many prokaryotes such as Escherichia coli (E. coli), and was first discovered as a DNA sequence in bacterial chromosomes and naturally occurring plasmids that encoded resistance to the antibiotics trimethoprim and streptomycin. Specifically classified as a transposable element (transposon), the sequence can duplicate and move itself within a genome by utilizing a self-encoded recombinase enzyme called a transposase, resulting in effects such as creating or reversing mutations and changing genome size. The Tn7 transposon has developed two mechanisms to promote its propagation among prokaryotes. Like many other bacterial transposons, Tn7 transposes at low-frequency and inserts into many different sites with little to no site-selectivity. Through this first pathway, Tn7 is preferentially directed into conjugable plasmids, which can be replicated and distributed between bacteria. However, Tn7 is unique in that it also transposes at high-frequency into a single specific site in bacterial chromosomes called attTn7. This specific sequence is an essential and highly conserved gene found in many strains of bacteria. However, the recombination is not deleterious to the host bacterium as Tn7 actually transposes downstream of the gene after recognizing it, resulting in a safe way to propagate the transposon without killing the host. This highly evolved and sophisticated target-site selection pathway suggests this pathway evolved to promote coexistence between the transposon and it host, as well as Tn7's successful transmission into future generations of bacterium.

The Tn7 transposon is 14 kb long and codes for five enzymes. The ends of the DNA sequence consists of two segments that the Tn7 transposase interacts with during recombination. The left segment (Tn7-L) is 150 bp long and the right sequence (Tn7-R) is 90 bp long. Both ends of the transposon contain a series of 22 bp binding sites that the Tn7 transposase recognizes and binds to. Within the transposon are five discrete genes encoding for proteins that make up the transposition machinery. In addition, the transposon contains an integron, a DNA segment containing several cassettes of genes encoding for antibiotic-resistance.

The Tn7 transposon codes for five proteins: TnsA, TnsB, TnsC, TnsD, and TnsE. TnsA and TnsB interact together to form the Tn7 transposase enzyme TnsAB. The enzyme specifically recognizes and binds to the ends of the DNA sequence of the transposon, and excises it by introducing double-stranded DNA breaks to each end. The excised sequence is then inserted to another target DNA site. Much like other characterized transposons, the mechanism for Tn7 transposition involves cleavage of the 3' ends from the donating DNA by the TnsA protein of the TnsAB transposase. However, Tn7 is also uniquely cleaved near the 5' ends, about 5 bp from the 5' end towards the Tn7 transposon, by the TnsB protein of TnsAB. After the insertion of the transposon into the target DNA site, the 3' ends are covalently linked to the target DNA, but the 5 bp gaps are still present at the 5' ends. As a result, repair of these gaps leads to a further 5 bp duplication at the target site. The TnsC protein interacts with the transposase enzyme and the target DNA to promote the excision and insertion processes. The ability of TnsC to activate the transposase depends on its interaction with a target DNA along with its appropriate targeting protein, TnsD or TnsE. The TnsD and TnsE proteins are alternative target selectors that are also DNA binding activators that promote excision and insertion of Tn7. Their ability to interact with a particular target DNA is key to the target-site selection of Tn7. The proteins TnsA, TnsB, and TnsC thus form the core machinery of Tn7: TnsA and TnsB interact together to form the transposase, while TnsC functions as a regulator of the transposase's activity, communicating between the transposase and TnsD and TnsE. When the TnsE protein interacts with the TnsABC core machinery, Tn7 preferentially directs insertions into conjugable plasmids. When the TnsD protein interacts with TnsABC, Tn7 preferentially directs insertions downstream into a single essential and highly conserved site in the bacterial chromosome. This site, attTn7, is specifically recognized by TnsD.
