= ZNF559 =

Human gene

Identifiers
- Aliases: ZNF559, NBLA00121, zinc finger protein 559
- External IDs: GeneCards: ZNF559

Gene location (Human)
Chr.	Chromosome 19 (human)
Band	19p13.2	Start	9,323,772 bp
Band	19p13.2	End	9,351,162 bp
RNA expression pattern
Bgee	Human / Mouse (ortholog); Top expressed in: secondary oocyte; ganglionic eminence; ventricular zone; parietal pleura; Achilles tendon; left ovary; right ovary; tibia; visceral pleura; right uterine tube / n/a; More reference expression data
BioGPS	n/a
Gene ontology
Molecular function	DNA binding; protein binding; metal ion binding; nucleic acid binding; DNA-binding transcription factor activity, RNA polymerase II-specific
Cellular component	intracellular anatomical structure; nucleus
Biological process	regulation of transcription, DNA-templated; transcription, DNA-templated; regulation of transcription by RNA polymerase II
Sources:Amigo / QuickGO
Orthologs
Databases	NCBI: entry; OMA: entry
Species	Human	Mouse
Entrez	84527	n/a
Ensembl	ENSG00000188321	n/a
UniProt	Q9BR84	n/a
RefSeq (mRNA)	NM_032497; NM_001202406; NM_001202407; NM_001202408; NM_001202409 NM_001202410; NM_001202411; NM_001202412	n/a
RefSeq (protein)	NP_001189335; NP_001189336; NP_001189337; NP_001189338; NP_001189339 NP_001189340; NP_001189341; NP_115886; NP_115886.1	n/a
Location (UCSC)	Chr 19: 9.32 – 9.35 Mb	n/a
PubMed search		n/a
- Wikidata
View/Edit Human

Zinc Finger 559 (ZNF559) is a protein which in humans is encoded by the ZNF559 gene. ZNF559 is a member of the Krüppel C_{2}H_{2}-type zinc finger protein family, characterized by its 13 C_{2}H_{2}-type zinc finger repeats. These motifs enable the protein to bind DNA in a sequence-specific manner, facilitating transcriptional regulation. Additionally, ZNF559 contains a Krüppel-associated box (KRAB) domain at its N-terminus, a common feature in many zinc finger proteins. The KRAB domain is known to mediate transcriptional repression by interacting with corepressor proteins, such as TRIM28, thereby silencing target gene expression. ZNF559 activity is localized to the nucleus, where it contributes to transcriptional regulation through protein and DNA interactions.

== Gene ==
ZNF559 is located on chromosome 19 (19p13.2) on the plus strand spanning 72 base pairs. ZNF559 is surrounded by other ZNF genes such as ZNF699 and ZNF177. ZNF559 has six exons.

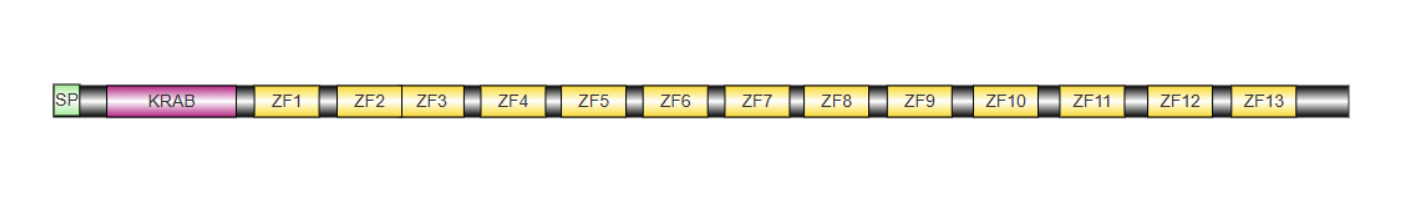
ZNF559 Protein Depiction. SP - Signal Peptide KRAB - KRAB box ZF - Zinc Finger 1-13

=== Expression ===
ZNF559 gene expression is ubiquitous and high across many tissues. Some of the tissues with the highest expression above 4.0 RPKM (reads per thousand nucleotides of transcript length per million) were the endometrium, lymph node, prostate, spleen, testis, thyroid, and urinary bladder.

== mRNA ==
There are eight known transcript variants and six isoforms for human ZNF559.

Isoform	Transcript Variant	mRNA length (bp)	Protein length (aa)	5'UTR (nt)
A	1	3009	602	407
B	2	4675	538	255
C	3	4622	496	328
D	4	3087	148	407
E	5	2886	112	330
F	6	2734	84	262
F	7	2763	84	291
F	8	2903	84	431

== Conceptual translation ==
The depicted conceptual translation for ZNF559 isoform A; contains 5' UTR, protein coding sequence, and the end of the 3'UTR region.

Conceptual Translation Table
Signal	Location	Color/Style
C_{2}H_{2} Structural Motif	158-177, 185–240, 213–243, 251–299, 307–327, 363–383, 391–411, 419–439, 447–467, 475–495, 503–523, 531–551, 559–579	Yellow highlight
Putative Nucleic Binding site	162, 164, 166, 168, 169, 172, 173, 176, 190, 192, 196, 197, 200, 201, 258, 260, 262, 263, 266, 267, 270, 396, 398, 400, 402, 403, 406, 407, 410, 424, 426, 430, 431, 434, 435, 438, 452, 454, 456, 458, 459, 462, 463, 466, 508, 510, 512, 514, 515, 518, 519, 522, 536, 538, 542, 546, 547, 550, 564, 568, 570, 571, 574, 575, 578	Green highlight
COG508, FOG: Zn Finger	221-601	Blue lettering
KRAB BOX pfam01352	77-118	Pink highlight
Signal Peptide	1-37	Grey lettering

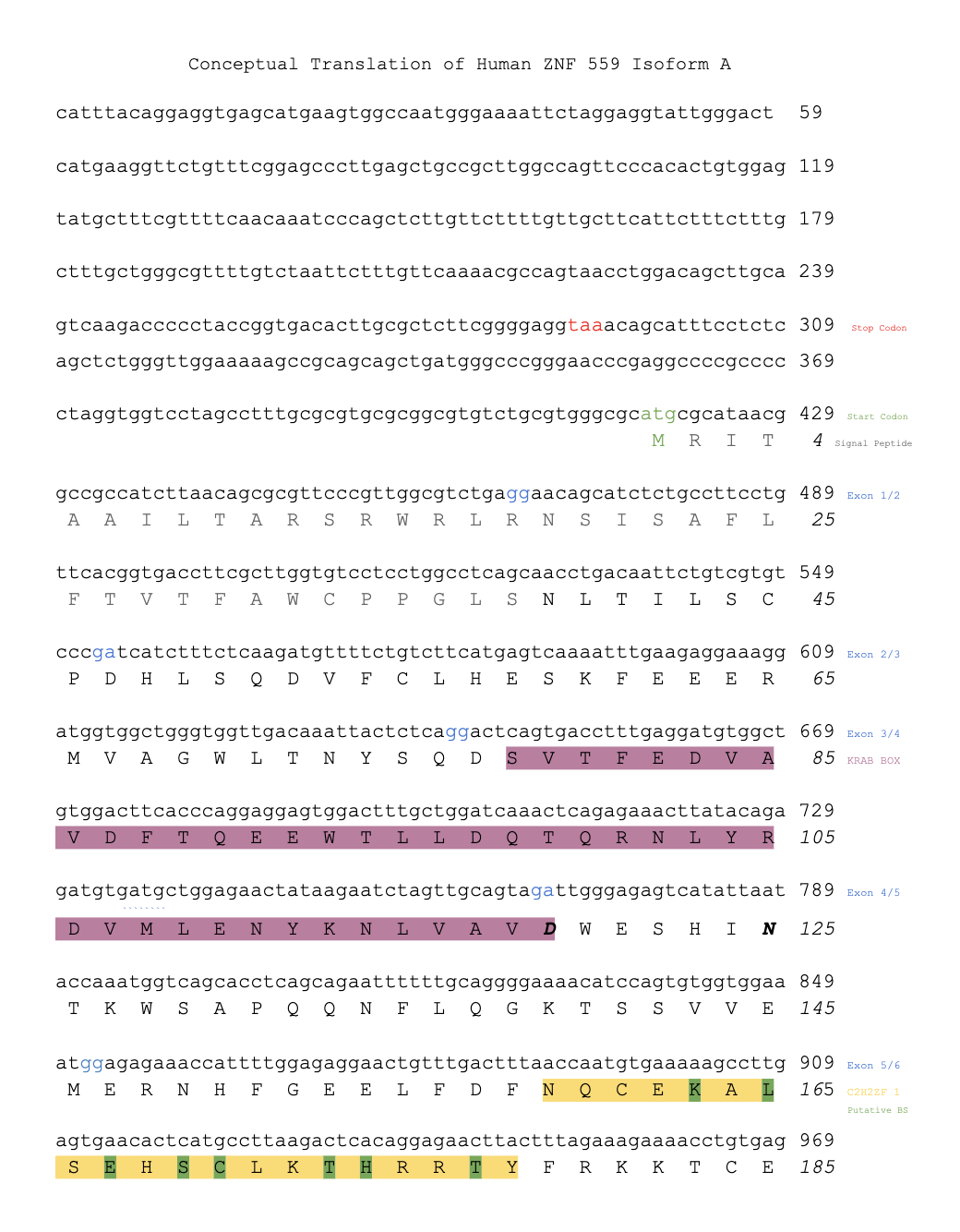
Conceptual Translation Part 1.

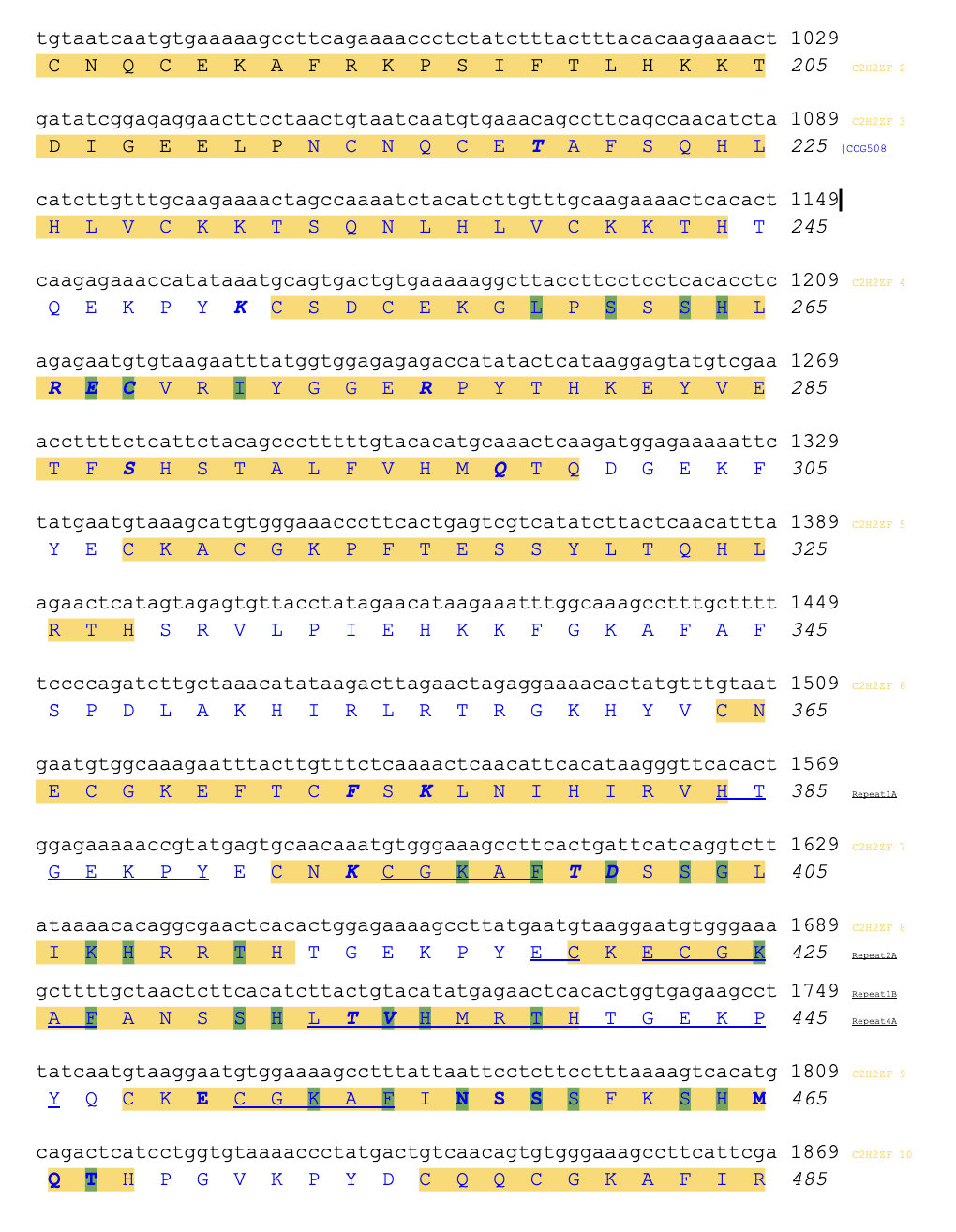
Conceptual Translation Part 2.

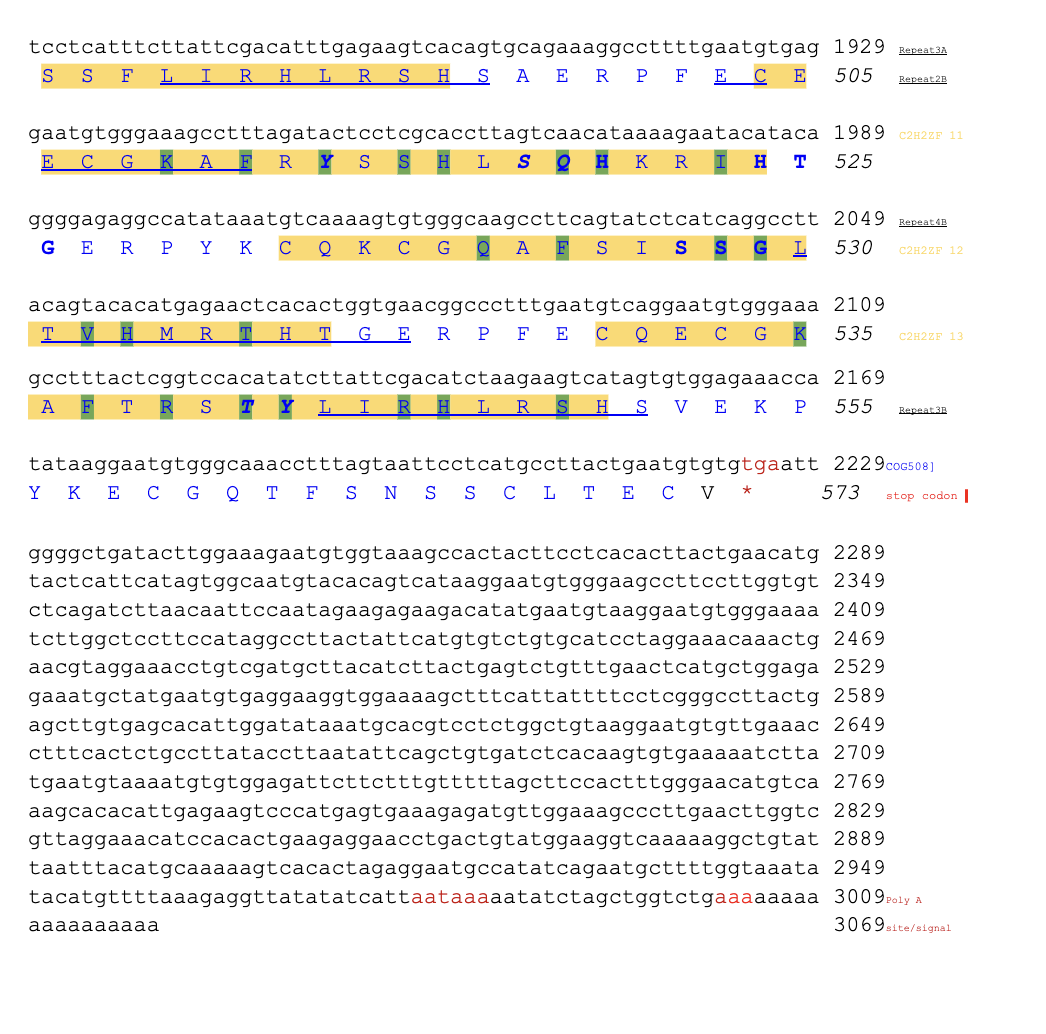
Conceptual Translation Part 3.

== Protein ==
For ZNF559 human isoform A has an isolelectric point of 8.9 and a molecular weight of 69kD. According to SAPS tool the amino acid composition is rich in cysteine, histidine, arginine, and lysine, which is typical for DNA binding proteins. The cysteine spacing gives results to 13 C_{2}H_{2} zinc finger motifs. There are three globular domains and five regions of disorder.

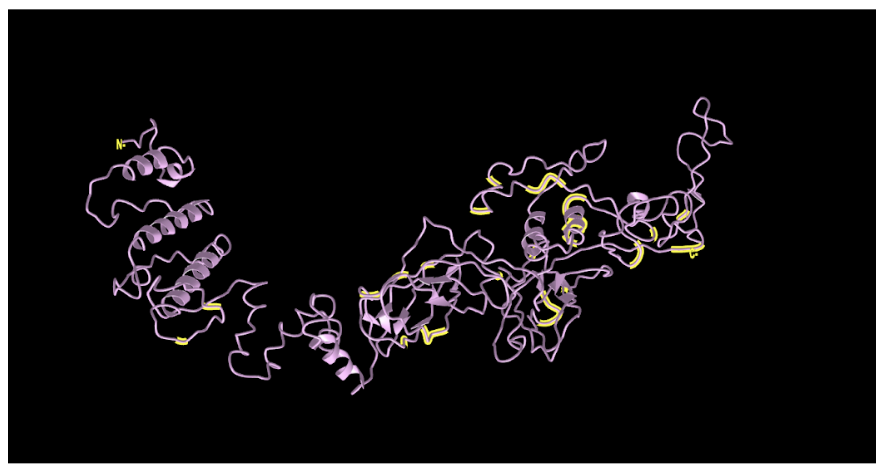
Structure of ZNF559. Yellow is the conserved regions.

=== Protein interaction ===
According to STRING many proteins are found to interact with ZNF559 related to transcription regulation and keratin.

Protein Interactions for ZNF559
Protein	Name	Function	Localization
ZNF385B	Zinc finger 385B	Role in p53/TP53-mediated apoptosis.	Nucleus
ZNF827	Zinc finger 827	Involved in transcriptional regulation.	Nucleus, Cytosol
ZNF773	Zinc finger 773	Involved in transcriptional regulation.	Nucleus, Cytosol
ZNF549	Zinc finger 559	Involved in transcriptional regulation.	Nucleus, Cytosol, Cytoskeleton
ZNF224	Zinc finger 224	Involved in transcriptional regulation as a transcriptional repressor.	Nucleus, Golgi, Lysosome, Cytoskeleton, ER, Mitochondria, Extracellular, PM
ZNF585A	Zinc finger 585A	Involved in transcriptional regulation.	Nucleus, Golgi
TRIM28	Tripartite-motif containing 28	Nuclear corepressor for KRAB domain-containing zinc finger proteins (KRAB-ZFPs).	Nucleus, Cytosol, Lysosome, ER, Mitochondrion, Cytoskeleton, Extracellular, PM,
FAM98C	Family 98C	Involved in RNA binding and transcriptional regulation.	Nucleus, Cytosol, Extracellular
KRBOX4	Krab box 4	KRAB box domain containing 4.	-
KRTAP10-1	Keratin associated protein 10–1	Structural hair-shaft protein contributing to keratin fiber formation.	Cytosol, Cytoskeleton, Extracellular, PM
KRTAP10-3	Keratin associated protein 10–3	Structural hair-shaft protein contributing to keratin fiber formation.	Cytosol, Cytoskeleton, Extracellular, PM
KRTAP10-5	Keratin associated protein 10–5	Structural hair-shaft protein contributing to keratin fiber formation.	Cytosol, Cytoskeleton, Extracellular, PM
SART3	Squamous carcinoma antigen recognized by T cells 3	Functions as an RNA-binding protein involved in pre-mRNA splicing and is a tumor-associated antigen.	Nucleus
CABP5	Calcium binding protein 5	Modulate L-type calcium channels, neurotransmitter vesicle endocytosis/exocytosis, and support neuronal signalling.	Cytosol, Nucleus

== Evolution ==
=== Orthologs ===
According to NBBI BLAST, the ZNF559 protein appears to be primate specific, with orthologs detected only in primates. ZNF559 orthologs are present in mammals and carnivores. No orthologs were detected in monotremes, marsupials, reptiles, birds, amphibians, or fish.

Orthologs for ZNF559
Species	Common Name	Protein Length (aa)	Similarity to Human Protein (%)	Date of Divergence (MYA)	Taxonomic Group
Pan Piniscus	Bonobo	602	99	6.4	Mammalia; Primates
Pongo abelii	Sumatran Orangutan	566	97	15.2	Mammalia; Primates
Hylobates moloch	Javan Gibbon	555	94	19.5	Mammalia; Primates
Macaca thibetana	Tibetan Macaque	564	95	28.8	Mammalia; Primates
Mandrillus leucophaeus	Drill	565	94	28.8	Mammalia; Primates
Papio anubis	Olive Baboon	553	93	28.8	Mammalia; Primates
Rhinopithecus roxellana	Golden Snub-nosed Monkey	536	94	28.8	Mammalia; Primates
Chlorocebus sabaeus	Green Monkey	564	94	28.8	Mammalia; Primates
Saimiri boliviensis	Bolivian Squirrel Monkey	563	81	43	Mammalia; Primates
Cynocephalus volans	Philippine Colugo	559	78	79	Dermoptera
Ursus arctos	Brown Bear	557	66	94	Carnivora (Ursidae)
Neogale vison	American Mink	567	39.8	94	Carnivora (Mustelidae)
Acinonyx jubatus	Cheetah	682	53	94	Carnivora (Felidae)
Prionailurus bengalensis	Leopard Cat	574	62	94	Carnivora (Felidae)
Odobenus rosmarus divergens	Pacific Walrus	530	60	94	Carnivora (Odobenidae)
Leptonychotes weddellii	Weddel Seal	514	57	92	Carnivora (Phocidae)
Neomonachus schauinslandi	Hawaiian Monk Seal	567	59	95	Carnivora (Phocidae)
Mirounga leonina	Southern Elephant Seal	536	56	95	Carnivora (Phocidae)
Camelus bactrianus	Bactrian Camel	697	61	81	Aritodactyla

=== Paralogs ===
According to NCBI BLAST ZNF559 in humans is characterized by two paralogs; ZNF426 and ZNF846.

Paralogs for ZNF559
Paralog	Location (Chromosome)	Similarity (%)
ZNF426	19	48.14
ZNF846	19	48.79

== Clinical significance ==
ZNF559 was identified as a gene that becomes silenced by promoter DNA methylation in gastric cancer. Treatment with a demethylating agent restored its expression in cancer cells, and methylation of ZNF559 was also detected in primary gastric tumors, suggesting its potential role in gastric carcinogenesis.

In a Waldenström's Macroglobulinemia (WM) study, ZNF559 was found to be overexpressed in CD138+ malignant cells compared to healthy donor cells. This suggests that ZNF559 may play a role in transcriptional regulation within the malignant plasma cell compartment of WM
