= H3R2me2 =

Epigenetic modification to the DNA packaging protein Histone H33

H3R2me2 is an epigenetic modification to the DNA packaging protein histone H3. It is a mark that indicates the di-methylation at the 2nd arginine residue of the histone H3 protein. In epigenetics, arginine methylation of histones H3 and H4 is associated with a more accessible chromatin structure and thus higher levels of transcription. The existence of arginine demethylases that could reverse arginine methylation is controversial.

== Nomenclature ==
The name of this modification indicates dimethylation of arginine 2 on histone H3 protein subunit:

Abbr.	Meaning
H3	H3 family of histones
R	standard abbreviation for arginine
2	position of amino acid residue (counting from N-terminus)
me	methyl group
2	number of methyl groups added

== Arginine ==
Arginine methylation by type I and II PRMTs.

Arginine can be methylated once (monomethylated arginine) or twice (dimethylated arginine). Methylation of arginine residues is catalyzed by three different classes of protein arginine methyltransferases.

Arginine methylation affects the interactions between proteins and has been implicated in a variety of cellular processes, including protein trafficking, signal transduction, and transcriptional regulation.

Arginine methylation plays a major role in gene regulation because of the ability of the PRMTs to deposit key activating (histone H4R3me2, H3R2me2, H3R17me2, H3R26me2) or repressive (H3R2me2, H3R8me2, H4R3me2) histone marks.

== Histone modifications ==
The genomic DNA of eukaryotic cells is wrapped around special protein molecules known as histones. The complexes formed by the looping of the DNA are known as chromatin.

== Mechanism and function of modification ==
JMJD6, a Jumonji domain-containing protein, was reported to demethylate H3R2me2. H3R2me2 is a major mark deposited by PRMT6. H3R2me1 and H3R2me2 marks are associated with highly expressed genes although H3R2me2 can block H3K4me3 effector molecules.

== Epigenetic implications ==
The post-translational modification of histone tails by either histone-modifying complexes or chromatin remodeling complexes is interpreted by the cell and leads to complex, combinatorial transcriptional output. It is thought that a histone code dictates the expression of genes by a complex interaction between the histones in a particular region. The current understanding and interpretation of histones comes from two large scale projects: ENCODE and the Epigenomic roadmap. The purpose of the epigenomic study was to investigate epigenetic changes across the entire genome. This led to chromatin states, which define genomic regions by grouping different proteins and/or histone modifications together. Chromatin states were investigated in Drosophila cells by looking at the binding location of proteins in the genome. Use of ChIP-sequencing revealed regions in the genome characterized by different banding. Different developmental stages were profiled in Drosophila as well, an emphasis was placed on histone modification relevance. A look in to the data obtained led to the definition of chromatin states based on histone modifications. Certain modifications were mapped and enrichment was seen to localize in certain genomic regions.

The human genome is annotated with chromatin states. These annotated states can be used as new ways to annotate a genome independently of the underlying genome sequence. This independence from the DNA sequence enforces the epigenetic nature of histone modifications. Chromatin states are also useful in identifying regulatory elements that have no defined sequence, such as enhancers. This additional level of annotation allows for a deeper understanding of cell specific gene regulation.

== Clinical significance ==
As of March 2021, PRMT6-mediated H3R2me2 role in early embryonic development and ES cell identity are unclear.

== Methods ==
The histone mark H3K4me1 can be detected in a variety of ways:

1. Chromatin Immunoprecipitation Sequencing (ChIP-sequencing) measures the amount of DNA enrichment once bound to a targeted protein and immunoprecipitated. It results in good optimization and is used in vivo to reveal DNA-protein binding occurring in cells. ChIP-Seq can be used to identify and quantify various DNA fragments for different histone modifications along a genomic region.

2. Micrococcal Nuclease sequencing (MNase-seq) is used to investigate regions that are bound by well-positioned nucleosomes. Use of the micrococcal nuclease enzyme is employed to identify nucleosome positioning. Well-positioned nucleosomes are seen to have enrichment of sequences.

3. Assay for transposase accessible chromatin sequencing (ATAC-seq) is used to look in to regions that are nucleosome free (open chromatin). It uses hyperactive Tn5 transposon to highlight nucleosome localisation.

== See also ==
- Histone methylation
- Histone methyltransferase
