= FAM98C =

Gene

Identifiers
- Aliases: FAM98C, family with sequence similarity 98 member C
- External IDs: MGI: 1921083; HomoloGene: 45483; GeneCards: FAM98C; OMA:FAM98C - orthologs

Gene location (Human)
Chr.	Chromosome 19 (human)
Band	19q13.2	Start	38,403,093 bp
Band	19q13.2	End	38,409,088 bp

Gene location (Mouse)
Chr.	Chromosome 7 (mouse)
Band	7|7 B1	Start	28,851,935 bp
Band	7|7 B1	End	28,855,659 bp
RNA expression pattern
Bgee	Human / Mouse (ortholog); Top expressed in: right hemisphere of cerebellum; cerebellar vermis; prefrontal cortex; skin of arm; right frontal lobe; cingulate gyrus; anterior cingulate cortex; Brodmann area 9; mucosa of ileum; mucosa of transverse colon / Top expressed in: spermatid; intestinal villus; spermatocyte; seminiferous tubule; duodenum; jejunum; crypt of lieberkuhn of small intestine; ileum; interventricular septum; colon; More reference expression data
BioGPS	n/a
Orthologs
Species	Human	Mouse
Entrez	147965	73833
Ensembl	ENSG00000130244	ENSMUSG00000030590
UniProt	Q17RN3	n/a
RefSeq (mRNA)	NM_174905; NM_001351675	NM_001146023; NM_028661
RefSeq (protein)	NP_777565; NP_001338604	n/a
Location (UCSC)	Chr 19: 38.4 – 38.41 Mb	Chr 7: 28.85 – 28.86 Mb
PubMed search
- Wikidata
View/Edit Human	View/Edit Mouse

Family with sequence 98, member C or FAM98C is a gene that encodes for FAM98C has two aliases FLJ44669 and hypothetical protein LOC147965. FAM98C has two paralogs in humans FAM98A and FAM98B. FAM98C can be characterized for being a Leucine-rich protein. The function of FAM98C is still not defined. FAM98C has orthologs in mammals, reptiles, and amphibians and has a distant orthologs in Rhinatrema bivittatum and Nanorana parkeri.

== Gene ==
=== Locus ===
The FAM98C gene is located on 19q13.2 in humans on the "+" strand. FAM98C spans from 38,403,135 to 38,409,088 bp. The primary mRNA transcript for the FAM98C gene is 5,954 base pairs in length. FAM98C neighbors include RASGRP4 and RYR1.

=== Transcripts ===
FAM98C has two known transcript variants. The first variant encodes for the longest isoform of 349 amino acids. The second variant is encodes for a short isoform of 267 amino acids. FAM98C is composed of eight exons.

== Proteins ==
The FAM98C protein is 349 amino acids in length with a predicted molecular weight of 37.3 kDa and a predicted isoelectric point of 6.89. Composition of FAM89A protein is notable for is its abundance of Leucine(16%) and the Lysine-rich C-terminus. FAM98C shows a high scoring positive segment with 6 consecutive Lysine residues.

=== Domains and motifs ===
FAM98C has a domain of unknown function 2465 (DUF2465) from the amino acids 18-334. This domain of unknown function is unique to the FAM98 family and is conserved in all orthologs. DUF2465 is fairly unknown but its proposed to bind to RNA. The domain in paralogs FAM98A binds to mRNA, FAM98B targets tRNA splicing.

=== Structure ===
The secondary structure of FAM98C is predicted to be composed of approximately 46% alpha helix, 46% random coil and 7% extended strand. However, no beta strands were found in any of the predicted secondary structures. The tertiary structure of FAM98C is predicted to have 10 alpha helices by the I-TASSER software.

== Gene level regulation ==
=== Promoter ===
The FAM98C promoter(GXP_7536558) region is 1254 base pairs in length. Both E2F-myc activator/cell cycle regulator and Krueppel like transcription factors had nineteen sites predicted to bind on the promoter.

=== Expression pattern ===
A GEO multiple normal tissue profile revealed that FAM98C is ubiquitously expressed, though not uniformly expressed. The highest expressions levels are in the jejunum, liver, and kidney.

=== Sub-cellular localization ===
The subcellular localization of FAM98C was predicted using the PSORT II tool. FAM98C is predicted to be localized in the nucleus (60.9%), followed by the mitochondria (21.7%) and then the cytoplasm (17.4%).

== Protein level regulation ==
=== Post-translational modifications ===
==== Phosphorylation ====
FAM98C has three predicted phosphorylation sites located at amino acid positions 225, 239, and 300 that are conserved in distant orthologs. The predicted phosphorylation site at position 225 is Tyrosine Kinase can function as an "on" and "off" switch. A predicted calmodulin-dependent protein kinase site at position 239.

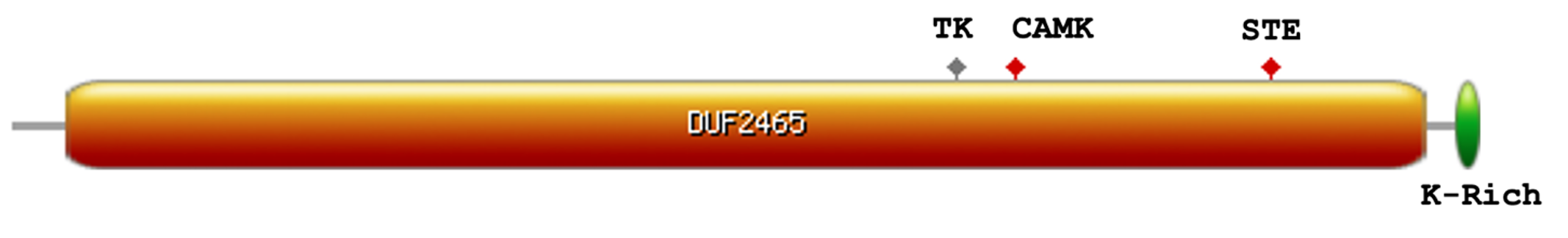
FAM98C Schematic illustration presents DUF2465 and three phosphorylation sites. FAM98C is mostly composed of the domain of unknown function 2465 The lysine-rich C-terminus is also presented in the illustration.

==== SUMOylation ====
Sumoylation is a post-translation modification process, that regulates a lot of proteins. The GPS CUCKOO workgroup database predicted SUMO protein sites at 347, 348 and 349. These residues were conserved in even the most distant FAM98C orthologs.

== Homology ==
=== Paralogs ===
FAM98C only has two paralogs FAM98A and FAM98B.

=== Orthologs ===
Orthologs for FAM98C have been found in mammals, reptiles and amphibians. FAM98C’s orthologs are present as far back as amphibians roughly estimated 351.8 million years ago(mya). FAM98C is only present in the Metazoan kingdom but not present in protozoa. Below is a table of a variety of orthologs for human FAM98C. The orthologs listed below are in descending order in the terms of the date of divergence.

Sequence Number	Genus species	Common Name	Taxonomic Group	Date of Divergence(MYA)	Accession Number	Sequence Length(aa)	Sequence Identity	Sequence Similarity
1	Homo sapiens	Human	Primates	0	NP_777565.3	349	100%	100%
2	Pan troglodytes	Chimpanzee	Primates	6.7	XP_524252.3	350	99%	99%
3	Microcebus murinus	Gray mouse lemur	Primates	73.8	XP_012630183.1	353	84%	88%
4	Octodon degus	Common degu	Rodentia	90	XP_023577316.1	352	78%	84%
5	Ochotona princeps	American pika	Lagomorpha	90	XP_004595135.1	353	77%	83%
6	Mus musculus	Mouse	Rodentia	90	NP_001139495.1	344	74%	79%
7	Rattus norvegicus	Brown Rat	Rodentia	90	NP_001185513.1	344	73%	80%
8	Bos taurus	Cattle	Artiodactyla	96	XP_002695017.1	353	81%	85%
9	Canis lupus familiaris	Dog	Carnivora	96	XP_541643.2	353	80%	83%
10	Leptonychotes weddellii	Weddell seal	Carnivora	96	XP_006739473.1	345	79%	84%
11	Monodon monoceros	Narwhal	Artiodactyla	96	XP_029092965.1	352	78%	84%
12	Desmodus rotundus	Common vampire bat	Chiroptera	96	XP_024433437.1	355	77%	83%
13	Chrysochloris asiatica	Cape golden mole	Afrosoricida	105	XP_006871606.1	348	75%	81%
14	Vombatus ursinus	common wombat	Diprotodontia	159	XP_027711296.1	358	64%	73%
15	Phascolarctos cinereus	koala	Diprotodontia	159	XP_020834255.1	358	64%	73%
16	Ornithorhynchus anatinus	Platypus	Monotremata	177	XP_028920793.1	338	57%	65%
17	Chelonoidis abingdonii	Pinta Island tortoise	Testudines	312	XP_032660367.1	329	44%	57%
18	Podarcis muralis	Common wall lizard	Squamata	312	XP_028597878.1	330	43%	55%
19	Python bivittatus	Burmese python	Squamata	312	XP_015745259.1	318	42%	58%
20	Nanorana parkeri	High Himalaya frog	Gymnophiona	351.8	XP_018411523.1	351	38%	55%
21	Rhinatrema bivittatum	two-lined caecilian	Anura	351.8	XP_029475031.1	338	38%	51%

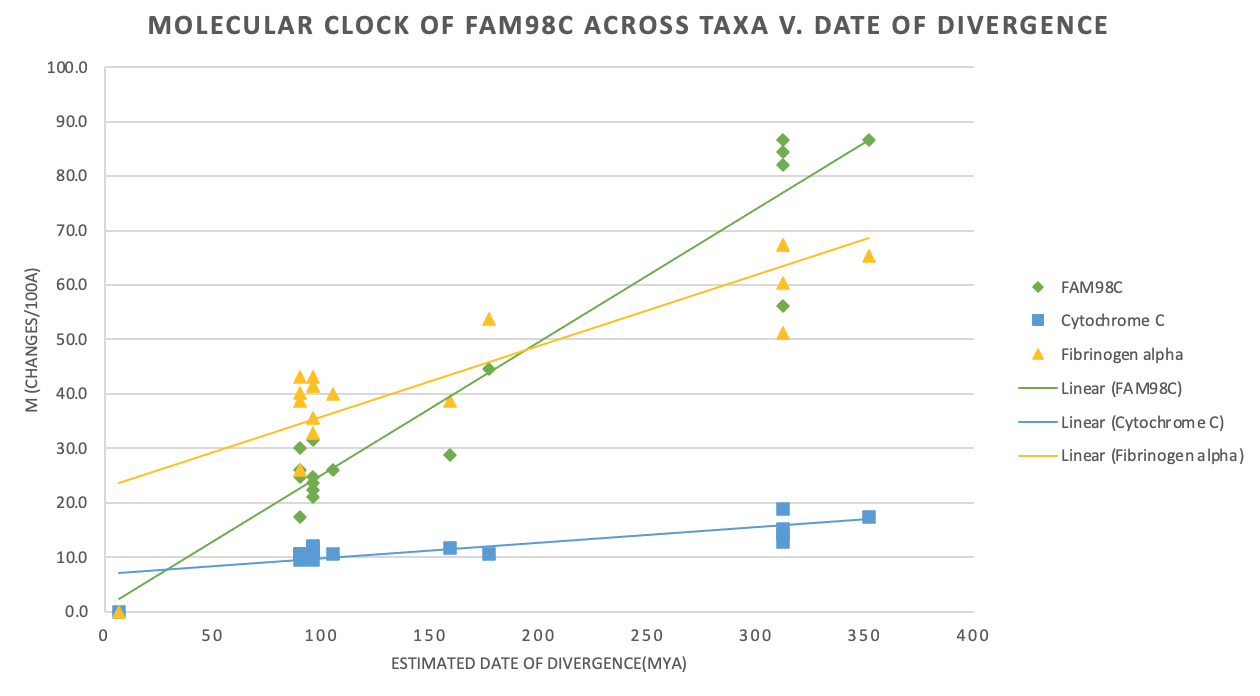
Rate of Divergence of FAM98C compared to fibrinogen and cytochrome c.

=== Rate of Evolution ===
FAM98C is rapidly evolving with a rate of divergence faster than both cytochrome C, a slowly evolving gene, and fibrinogen, a rapidly evolving gene.

== Interacting proteins ==
FAM98C has been predicted to interact with DR1, LRRCC1, FAM83F, TMEM256, Pdrm16 and SPRED1. LRRCC1 and TMEM256 were both mentioned with FAM98C as potentially novel genes that are related with ciliopathies.

== Clinical significance ==
In a bioinformatics study, FAM98C and 9 other novel genes were identified to be associated with a prognosis of cholangiocarcinoma.
