= Nutrient sensing =

Nutrient sensing is a cell's ability to recognize and respond to fuel substrates such as glucose. Each type of fuel used by the cell requires an alternate pathway of utilization and accessory molecules such as enzymes and cofactors. In order to conserve resources a cell will only produce molecules that it needs at the time. The level and type of fuel that is available to a cell will determine the type of enzymes it needs to express from its genome for utilization. Receptors on the cell membrane's surface designed to be activated in the presence of specific fuel molecules communicate to the cell nucleus via a means of cascading interactions. Nutrient receptors are receptors that are primarily designed to perform the function of nutrient sensing, whereas other receptors (e.g. insulin receptors, leptin receptors) are extensively multifunctional and perform many functions besides nutrient sensing. In this way the cell is aware of the available nutrients and is able to produce only the molecules specific to that nutrient type.

== Nutrient sensing in mammalian cells ==
A rapid and efficient response to disturbances in nutrient levels is crucial for the survival of organisms from bacteria to humans. Cells have therefore evolved a host of molecular pathways that can sense nutrient concentrations and quickly regulate gene expression and protein modification to respond to any changes.

Cell growth is regulated by coordination of both extracellular nutrients and intracellular metabolite concentrations. AMP-activated kinase (AMPK) and mammalian target of rapamycin complex 1 serve as key molecules that sense cellular energy and nutrients levels, respectively.

- The interplay among nutrients, metabolites, gene expression, and protein modification are involved in the coordination of cell growth with extracellular and intracellular conditions.

Living cells use ATP as the most important direct energy source. Hydrolysis of ATP to ADP and phosphate (or AMP and pyrophosphate) provides energy for most biological processes. The ratio of ATP to ADP and AMP is a barometer of cellular energy status and is therefore tightly monitored by the cell. In eukaryotic cells, AMPK serves as a key cellular energy sensor and a master regulator of metabolism to maintain energy homeostasis.

== Nutrient sensing and epigenetics ==
Nutrient sensing and signaling is a key regulator of epigenetic machinery in cancer. During glucose shortage, the energy sensor AMPK activates arginine methyltransferase CARM1 and mediates histone H3 hypermethylation (H3R17me2), leading to enhanced autophagy. In addition, O-GlcNAc transferase (OGT) signals glucose availability to TET3 and inhibits TET3 by both decreasing its dioxygenase activity and promoting its nuclear export. OGT is also known to directly modify histones with O-GlcNAc. These observations strongly suggest that nutrient signaling directly targets epigenetic enzymes to control epigenetic modifications.

== Regulation of tissue growth ==
Nutrient sensing is a key regulator of tissue growth. The main mediator of cellular nutrient sensing is the protein kinase TOR (target of rapamycin). TOR receives information from levels of cellular amino acids and energy, and it regulates the activity of processes involved in cell growth, such as protein synthesis and autophagy. Insulin-like signaling is the main mechanism of systemic nutrient sensing and mediates its growth-regulatory functions largely through the protein kinase pathway. Other nutrition-regulated hormonal mechanisms contribute to growth control of modulating the activity of insulin-like signaling.

== Nutrient sensing in plants ==
Higher plants require a number of essential nutrient elements for completing their life cycles. Mineral nutrients are mainly acquired by roots from the rhizosphere and are subsequently distributed to shoots. To overcome with nutrient limitations, plants have evolved a set of elaborate responses consisting of sensing mechanisms and signaling processes to perceive and adapt to external nutrient availability.

Plants obtain most necessary nutrients by taking them up from the soil into their roots. Although plants cannot move to a new environment when nutrient availability is less than favorable, they can modify their development to favor root colonization of soil areas where nutrients are abundant. Therefore, plants perceive the availability of external nutrients, like nitrogen, and couple this nutrient sensing to an appropriate adaptive response.

=== Types of nutrients in plants ===
Potassium (K^{+}) and phosphorus (P^{+}) are important macronutrients for crops but are often deficient in the field. Very little is known about how plants sense fluctuations in concentrations of K^{+} and P^{+}, and how such sensing is integrated at the organismic level into physiological and metabolic adaptations. Smaller amounts of other micronutrients are also important for the growth of the crop. All of these nutrients are equally important for the growth of the plant and lack of one nutrient can result in poor growth of the plant as well as becoming more vulnerable to diseases or can lead to death. These nutrients along with CO_{2} and energy from the sun aids in the development of the plant.

=== Nitrogen sensing ===
As one of the most vital nutrients for the development and growth of all plants, nitrogen sensing and the signalling response are vital for plants to live. Plants absorb nitrogen through the soil in the form of either nitrate or ammonia. In soil with low oxygen levels, ammonia is the primary nitrogen source, but toxicity is carefully controlled for with the transcription of ammonium transporters (AMTs). This metabolite and others including glutamate and glutamine have been shown to act as a signal of low nitrogen through regulation of nitrogen transporter gene transcription. NRT1.1, also known as CHL1, is the nitrate transceptor (transporter and receptor) found on the plasma membrane of plants. This is both a high and low affinity transceptor that senses varying concentrations of nitrate depending on its T101 residue phosphorylation. It has been shown that nitrate can also act as just a signal for plants, since mutants unable to metabolize are still able to sense the ion. For example, many plants show the increase of nitrate-regulated genes in low nitrate conditions and consistent mRNA transcription of such genes in soil high in nitrate. This demonstrates the ability to sense nitrate soil concentrations without metabolic products of nitrate and still exhibit downstream genetic effects.

=== Potassium Sensing ===
Potassium (K+), one of the essential macronutrients is found in plant soil. K+ is the most abundant cation and it is very limited in plant soil. Plants absorb K+ from the soil through channels that are found at the plasma membrane of root cells. Potassium is not assimilated into organic matter like other nutrients such as nitrate and ammonium but serves as a major osmoticum.

== Brain and gut regulation of food intake ==
Maintaining a careful balance between stored energy and caloric intake is important to ensure that the body has enough energy to maintain itself, grow, and engage in activity. When balanced improperly, obesity and its accompanying disorders can result.
