= Cardiomyocyte proliferation =

Cardiomyocyte proliferation refers to the ability of cardiac muscle cells to progress through the cell cycle and continue to divide. Traditionally, cardiomyocytes were believed to have little to no ability to proliferate and regenerate after birth. Although other types of cells, such as gastrointestinal epithelial cells, can proliferate and differentiate throughout life, cardiac tissue contains little intrinsic ability to proliferate, as adult human cells arrest in the cell cycle. However, a recent paradigm shift has occurred. Recent research has demonstrated that human cardiomyocytes do proliferate to a small extent for the first two decades of life. Also, cardiomyocyte proliferation and regeneration has been demonstrated to occur in various neonatal mammals in response to injury in the first week of life. Current research aims to further understand the biological mechanism underlying cardiomyocyte proliferation in hopes to turn this capability back on in adults in order to combat heart disease.

== By species ==
=== Zebrafish ===
Adult zebrafish have a remarkable ability to completely regenerate cardiac muscle after injury. There are similar genes in zebrafish and humans that control the development of the heart and the phenomenal ability of zebrafish cardiomyocytes to proliferate in response to injury has made it a popular research model. When approximately 20% of the ventricle is resected from adult zebrafish, the cardiac muscle completely regenerates. Injury stimulates a subset of cardiomyocytes in the zebrafish heart that are able to proliferate and dedifferentiate. Cardiomyocytes of zebrafish are mononucleated and diploid.

=== Mammals ===
After cardiomyocyte proliferation and regeneration was demonstrated to occur in zebrafish after resection, various animal models were utilized in order to explore whether mammals also have this innate ability. In 2011, Porrello et al. demonstrated that neonatal mice are able to regenerate heart muscle after resection. Since 2011, many other research groups have explored cardiomyocyte regeneration. The cardiomyocytes of neonatal rats and piglets are also able to undergo proliferation in response to injury during the first week of life.

=== Humans ===
In 2009, Dr. Jonas Frisén's research group used a technique implementing carbon-dating of cardiomyocytes to propose that human adult cardiomyocytes do proliferate, but at a very slow rate. There have also been case reports that suggest that the cardiomyocytes of newborns are able to proliferate in response to ischemia. A 2013 paper demonstrated that there are a small number of cardiomyocytes in mitosis and cytokinesis in humans up to age 20, with the highest percentage present in infants.

== Signaling pathways ==
The complete biological mechanism underlying cardiomyocyte proliferation has not been fully elucidated. However, there are various transcription factors and signaling cascades thought to be very important. Cardiomyocytes have been shown to be encouraged to exit the cell cycle then cyclin-dependent kinases are downregulated, or when cell cycle inhibitors are introduced. Many of the signals that a cell receives during phase G1 determine whether the cell will undergo proliferation. Cyclin-dependent kinases and cyclin-dependent kinase inhibitors play key roles in this process. One gene, jumonji (jmj), has been shown to start increasing in its expression in embryonic day 10.5 mice and is proposed to help cease the proliferation of cardiomyocytes by repressing the expression of cyclin D1. Jumonji is believed to recruit G9a and GLP methyltransferases to the cyclin D1 promoter, which are thought to methylate histones H3-H9 and repress cyclin D1 expression.

The transcription factor family E2F are also thought to be very important in regulating cardiomyocyte proliferation. E2F transcription factors influence cellular proliferation and help control apoptosis. When cardiomyocytes were transfected with adenoviruses expressing E2F2, cyclins A and E were upregulated, and cardiomyocytes proliferated.

The cessation of the cardiomyocyte cell cycle is believed to be regulated by transcription factors and cyclin dependent kinase inhibitors, although the exact mechanism remains unclear. One transcription facet that has been shown to be key in his process is Meis1. Meis1 has been shown to be necessary for the activation of the cyclin-dependent kinase inhibitors p15, p16, and p21. Knockout experiments demonstrated that the length of cardiomyocyte proliferation can be extended when Meis1 is deleted in mice. Meis1 has been shown to play a role in the regulation of anaerobic glycolysis. This is particularly interesting because cardiomyocytes undergo a shift in their metabolism during development: cardiomyocytes rely on glycolytic metabolism but switch to relying on oxidative phosphorylation. One research group demonstrated that neonatal transgenic mice deficient in fatty acids had a longer time span in which their cardiomyocytes were able proliferate in response to injury.

Furthermore, oxygen metabolism is thought to play a role in cardiomyocyte proliferation. Using a mouse model of myocardial infarction to induce cardiac tissue damage, adult mice exhibited an increase in the proliferation of cardiomyocytes when put in a hypoxic environment. When mice are born, they switch from being in a hypoxic intrauterine environment to an environment rich in oxygen. One research group has shown that oxidative DNA damage to cells and the cellular response to this damage increases in the first week of life, which correlates with the time point when mammalian cardiomyocytes start to lose the ability to regenerate. In the intrauterine environment, cardiomyocytes have limited exposure to oxygen and little damage from reactive oxygen species. At the same time, cardiomyocytes are proliferating in utero. When neonatal mice were exposed to a hypoxic environment after ischemic heart damage, the cardiomyocytes are encouraged to enter mitosis and proliferate.

Another signaling pathway thought to be important for the ability of cardiomyocytes to proliferate is the Hippo pathway, which was previously shown to regulate organ size in a fruit fly model. When key proteins in the Hippo pathway are inactivated in a mouse model, the embryos exhibit cardiomyocyte proliferation and cardiomegaly. Hippo is thought to interact with the Wnt signaling pathway to limit the size of the heart and encourage cessation of cardiomyocyte proliferation.

== Clinical implications ==
Heart disease continues to be one of the leading causes of death in the United States. The progression of coronary artery disease can lead to weakened heart muscle and heart failure. If atherosclerosis progresses to the point of occluding a coronary artery, myocardial ischemia and damage can occur, resulting in irreversible cardiomyocyte death. Further understanding of the biological mechanism underlying the cardiomyocyte proliferation that has been demonstrated in adult zebrafish and neonatal mice, rats, and piglets could provide insight into how it may be possible to encourage cardiomyocyte proliferation and heart regeneration in patients with ischemic heart disease or for patients in heart failure.
