= CIDEA =

Protein-coding gene in humans

Available structures
PDB	Ortholog search: PDBe RCSB
PDB	List of PDB id codes 2EEL

Identifiers
- Aliases: CIDEA, CIDE-A, cell death-inducing DFFA-like effector a, cell death inducing DFFA like effector a
- External IDs: OMIM: 604440; MGI: 1270845; HomoloGene: 77852; GeneCards: CIDEA; OMA:CIDEA - orthologs

Gene location (Human)
Chr.	Chromosome 18 (human)
Band	18p11.21|18	Start	12,254,361 bp
Band	18p11.21|18	End	12,277,595 bp

Gene location (Mouse)
Chr.	Chromosome 18 (mouse)
Band	18|18 E1	Start	67,476,674 bp
Band	18|18 E1	End	67,500,855 bp
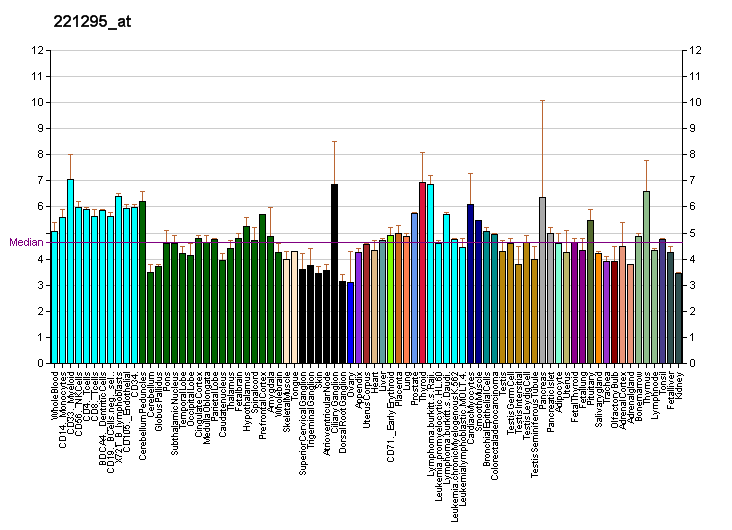
RNA expression pattern
Bgee	Human / Mouse (ortholog); Top expressed in: abdominal fat; subcutaneous adipose tissue; skin of thigh; vulva; synovial joint; skin of arm; skin of abdomen; human penis; prefrontal cortex; pericardium / Top expressed in: tunica adventitia of aorta; intercostal muscle; skin of external ear; parotid gland; lip; tunica media of zone of aorta; mammary gland; subcutaneous adipose tissue; trachea; brown adipose tissue; More reference expression data
BioGPS	More reference expression data
Gene ontology
Molecular function	protein homodimerization activity
Cellular component	cytoplasm; lipid droplet; intracellular anatomical structure; mitochondrion; mitochondrial envelope; nucleus; cytosol
Biological process	regulation of apoptotic process; negative regulation of execution phase of apoptosis; regulation of transcription, DNA-templated; lipid metabolism; lipid storage; cell death; negative regulation of transforming growth factor beta receptor signaling pathway; transcription, DNA-templated; positive regulation of sequestering of triglyceride; response to stilbenoid; negative regulation of tumor necrosis factor production; temperature homeostasis; negative regulation of lipid catabolic process; regulation of apoptotic DNA fragmentation; apoptotic process; lipid droplet organization; negative regulation of cold-induced thermogenesis
Sources:Amigo / QuickGO
Orthologs
Species	Human	Mouse
Entrez	1149	12683
Ensembl	ENSG00000176194	ENSMUSG00000024526
UniProt	O60543	O70302
RefSeq (mRNA)	NM_001279; NM_001318383	NM_007702
RefSeq (protein)	NP_001270; NP_001305312	NP_031728
Location (UCSC)	Chr 18: 12.25 – 12.28 Mb	Chr 18: 67.48 – 67.5 Mb
PubMed search
- Wikidata
View/Edit Human	View/Edit Mouse

Cell death activator CIDE-A is a protein that in humans is encoded by the CIDEA gene. Cidea is an essential transcriptional coactivator regulating mammary gland secretion of milk lipids.

This gene encodes the homolog of the mouse protein Cidea that has been shown to activate apoptosis. This activation of apoptosis is inhibited by the DNA fragmentation factor DFF45 but not by caspase inhibitors. Mice that lack functional Cidea have higher metabolic rates, higher lipolysis in brown adipose tissue and higher core body temperatures when subjected to cold. These mice are also resistant to diet-induced obesity and diabetes. This suggests that in mice this gene product plays a role in thermogenesis and lipolysis. Two alternative transcripts encoding different isoforms have been identified.
