= PRDM16 =

Protein found in humans

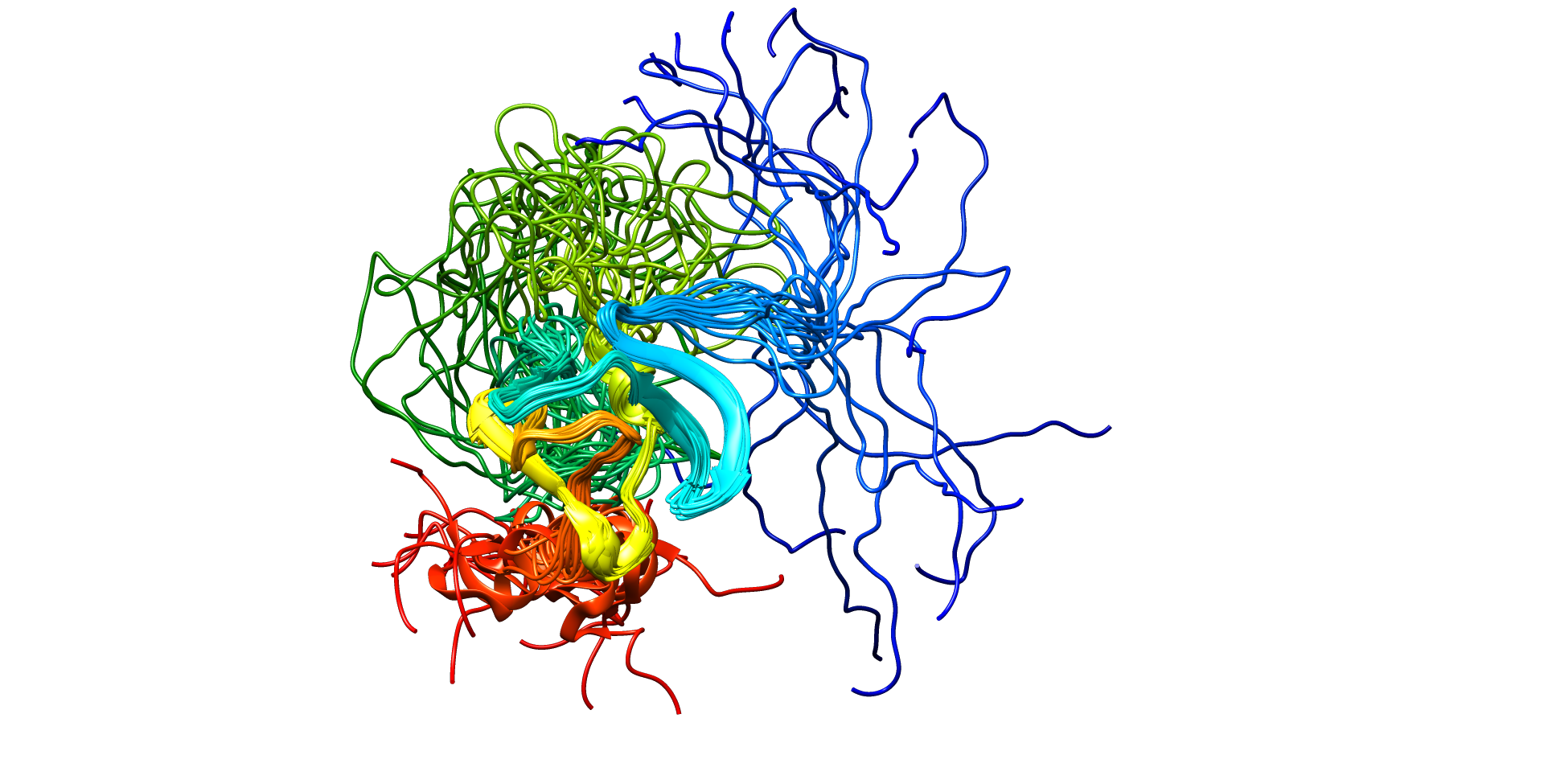

Identifiers
- Aliases: PRDM16, CMD1LL, LVNC8, MEL1, PFM13, PR domain 16, PR/SET domain 16, KMT8F
- External IDs: OMIM: 605557; MGI: 1917923; GeneCards: PRDM16
Available structures
PDB	Ortholog search: PDBe RCSB
PDB	List of PDB id codes 2N1I
Enzyme activity
EC #	BRENDA	ExPASy	KEGG	MetaCyc
2.1.1.367	↗	↗	↗	↗

Gene location (Human)
Chr.	Chromosome 1 (human)
Band	1p36.32	Start	3,069,168 bp
Band	1p36.32	End	3,438,621 bp

Gene location (Mouse)
Chr.	Chromosome 4 (mouse)
Band	4|4 E2	Start	154,400,582 bp
Band	4|4 E2	End	154,721,330 bp
RNA expression pattern
Bgee	Human / Mouse (ortholog); Top expressed in: sural nerve; retinal pigment epithelium; ascending aorta; Descending thoracic aorta; ventricular zone; popliteal artery; tibial arteries; right coronary artery; pancreatic epithelial cell; left coronary artery / Top expressed in: hand; retinal pigment epithelium; ascending aorta; Epithelium of choroid plexus; aortic valve; Rostral migratory stream; lateral septal nucleus; ciliary body; epithelium of stomach; lumbar subsegment of spinal cord; More reference expression data
BioGPS	n/a
Gene ontology
Molecular function	protein binding; metal ion binding; sequence-specific DNA binding; SMAD binding; transcription coactivator activity; DNA binding; nucleic acid binding; histone-lysine N-methyltransferase activity; DNA-binding transcription factor activity, RNA polymerase II-specific; histone methyltransferase activity (H3-K9 specific); methyltransferase activity; transferase activity
Cellular component	transcription repressor complex; nucleus; nucleoplasm; cytosol; aggresome; cytoplasm
Biological process	positive regulation of brown fat cell differentiation; tongue development; transcription, DNA-templated; regulation of cellular respiration; somatic stem cell population maintenance; neurogenesis; stem cell population maintenance; negative regulation of transcription by RNA polymerase II; white fat cell differentiation; roof of mouth development; negative regulation of transforming growth factor beta receptor signaling pathway; brown fat cell differentiation; regulation of transcription, DNA-templated; cell differentiation; negative regulation of granulocyte differentiation; positive regulation of transcription, DNA-templated; negative regulation of transcription, DNA-templated; histone lysine methylation; positive regulation of cold-induced thermogenesis; histone H3-K9 methylation; heterochromatin organization; methylation
Sources:Amigo / QuickGO
Orthologs
Databases	NCBI: entry; OMA: entry
Species	Human	Mouse
Entrez	63976	70673
Ensembl	ENSG00000142611	ENSMUSG00000039410
UniProt	Q9HAZ2	A2A935
RefSeq (mRNA)	NM_022114; NM_199454	NM_001177995; NM_001291026; NM_001291029; NM_027504
RefSeq (protein)	NP_071397; NP_955533	NP_001171466; NP_001277955; NP_001277958; NP_081780
Location (UCSC)	Chr 1: 3.07 – 3.44 Mb	Chr 4: 154.4 – 154.72 Mb
PubMed search
- Wikidata
View/Edit Human	View/Edit Mouse

PR domain containing 16, also known as PRDM16, is a protein which in humans is encoded by the PRDM16 gene.

PRDM16 acts as a transcription coregulator that controls the development of brown adipocytes in brown adipose tissue. Previously, this coregulator was believed to be present only in brown adipose tissue, but more recent studies have shown that PRDM16 is highly expressed in subcutaneous white adipose tissue as well.

== Function ==
The protein encoded by this gene is a zinc finger transcription factor. PRDM16 controls the cell fate between muscle and brown fat cells. Loss of PRDM16 from brown fat precursors causes a loss of brown fat characteristics and promotes muscle differentiation.

== Clinical significance ==
The reciprocal translocation t(1;3)(p36;q21) occurs in a subset of myelodysplastic syndrome (MDS) and acute myeloid leukemia (AML). This gene is located near the 1p36.3 breakpoint and has been shown to be specifically expressed in the t(1:3)(p36;q21)-positive MDS/AML. The protein encoded by this gene contains an N-terminal PR domain. The translocation results in the overexpression of a truncated version of this protein that lacks the PR domain, which may play an important role in the pathogenesis of MDS and AML. Alternatively spliced transcript variants encoding distinct isoforms have been reported.

== PRDM16 in BAT ==
Brown adipose tissue (BAT) oxidizes chemical energy to produce heat. This heat energy can act as a defense against hypothermia and obesity. PRDM16 is highly enriched in brown adipose cells as compared to white adipose cells, and plays a role in these thermogenic processes in brown adipose tissue. PRDM16 activates brown fat cell identity and can control the determination of brown adipose fate. A knock-out of PRDM16 in mice shows a loss of brown cell characteristics, showing that PRDM16 activity is important in determining brown adipose fate. Brown adipocytes consist of densely packed mitochondria that contain uncoupling protein 1 (UCP-1). UCP-1 plays a key role in brown adipocyte thermogenesis. The presence of PRDM16 in adipose tissue causes a significant up-regulation of thermogenic genes, such as UCP-1 and CIDEA, resulting in thermogenic heat production. Understanding and stimulating the thermogenic processes in brown adipocytes provides possible therapeutic options for treating obesity.

== PRDM16 in WAT ==
White adipose tissue (WAT) primarily stores excess energy in the form of triglycerides. Recent research has shown that PRDM16 is present in subcutaneous white adipose tissue. The activity of PRDM16 in white adipose tissue leads to the production of brown fat-like adipocytes within white adipose tissue, called beige cells (also called brite cells). These beige cells have a brown adipose tissue-like phenotype and actions, including thermogenic processes seen in BAT. In mice, the levels of PRDM16 within WAT, specifically anterior subcutaneous WAT and inguinal subcutaneous WAT, is about 50% that of interscapular BAT, both in protein expression and in mRNA quantity. This expression takes place primarily within mature adipocytes. Transgenic aP2-PRDM16 mice were used in a study to observe the effects of PRDM16 expression in WAT. The study found that the presence of PRDM16 in subcutaneous WAT leads to a significant up-regulation of brown-fat selective genes UCP-1, CIDEA, and PPARGC1A. This up-regulation lead to the development of a BAT-like phenotype within the white adipose tissue. Expression of PRDM16 has also been shown to protect against high-fat diet induced weight gain. Seale et al.’s experiment with aP2-PRDM16 transgenic mice and wild type mice showed that transgenic mice eating a 60% high-fat diet had significantly less weight gain than wild type mice on the same diet. Seale et al. determined the weight difference was not due to differences in food intake, as both transgenic and wild type mice were consuming the same amount of food on a daily basis. Rather, the weight difference stemmed from higher energy expenditure in the transgenic mice. Another of Seale et al.’s experiments showed the transgenic mice consumed a greater volume of oxygen over a 72-hour period than the wild type mice, showing a greater amount of energy expenditure in the transgenic mice. This energy expenditure in turn is attributed to PRDM16’s ability to up-regulate UCP-1 and CIDEA gene expression, resulting in thermogenesis.

If human WAT expresses PRDM16 as in mice, this WAT could be a potential target for stimulating energy expenditure and combating obesity.
