= Zinc finger protein 773 =

Protein found in humans

ZNF773

Identifiers
- Aliases: ZNF773, ZNF419B, zinc finger protein 773
- External IDs: MGI: 2385265; GeneCards: ZNF773

Gene location (Human)
Chr.	Chromosome 19 (human)
Band	19q13.43	Start	57,499,915 bp
Band	19q13.43	End	57,518,404 bp

Gene location (Mouse)
Chr.	Chromosome 7 (mouse)
Band	7|7 A1	Start	7,205,116 bp
Band	7|7 A1	End	7,212,997 bp
RNA expression pattern
Bgee	Human / Mouse (ortholog); Top expressed in: gonad; testicle; ventricular zone; left adrenal cortex; left lobe of thyroid gland; right adrenal cortex; right lobe of thyroid gland; pituitary gland; stromal cell of endometrium; anterior pituitary / Top expressed in: tail of embryo; genital tubercle; esophagus; ventricular zone; substantia nigra; skin of external ear; morula; lumbar subsegment of spinal cord; dentate gyrus of hippocampal formation granule cell; right kidney; More reference expression data
BioGPS	n/a
Gene ontology
Molecular function	DNA binding; metal ion binding; nucleic acid binding
Cellular component	intracellular anatomical structure; nucleus
Biological process	transcription, DNA-templated; regulation of transcription, DNA-templated
Sources:Amigo / QuickGO
Orthologs
Databases	NCBI: entry; OMA: entry
Species	Human	Mouse
Entrez	374928	232855
Ensembl	ENSG00000152439	ENSMUSG00000066838
UniProt	Q6PK81	Q3UQL6
RefSeq (mRNA)	NM_001304334; NM_001304335; NM_001304336; NM_001304337; NM_198542	NM_145577
RefSeq (protein)	NP_001291263; NP_001291264; NP_001291265; NP_001291266; NP_940944	NP_663552
Location (UCSC)	Chr 19: 57.5 – 57.52 Mb	Chr 7: 7.21 – 7.21 Mb
PubMed search
- Wikidata
View/Edit Human	View/Edit Mouse

Zinc finger protein 773 is a protein that in humans is encoded by the ZNF773 gene.
