= JARID2 =

Protein-coding gene in the species Homo sapiens

Identifiers
- Aliases: JARID2, JMJ, jumonji and AT-rich interaction domain containing 2
- External IDs: OMIM: 601594; MGI: 104813; GeneCards: JARID2
Available structures
| PDB | Ortholog search: PDBe RCSB |
| PDB | List of PDB id codes 5HYN |

Gene location (Human)
| Chr. | Chromosome 6 (human) |
| Band | 6p22.3 | Start | 15,246,069 bp |
| Band | 6p22.3 | End | 15,522,042 bp |

Gene location (Mouse)
| Chr. | Chromosome 13 (mouse) |
| Band | 13 A5|13 21.66 cM | Start | 44,882,950 bp |
| Band | 13 A5|13 21.66 cM | End | 45,075,119 bp |
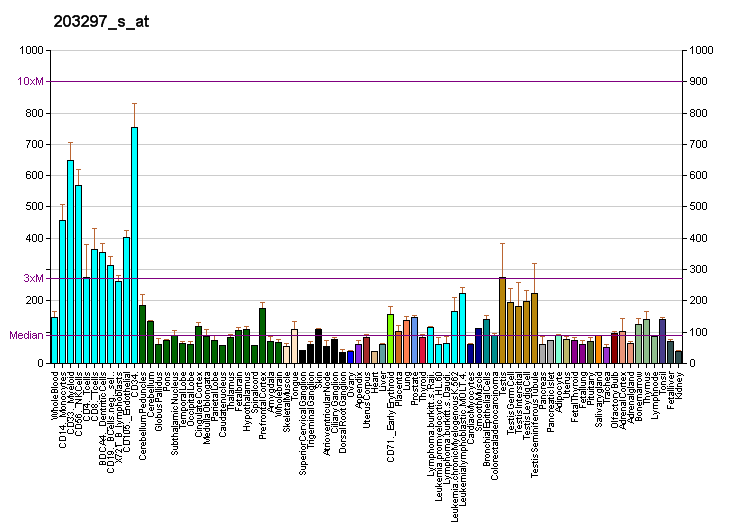

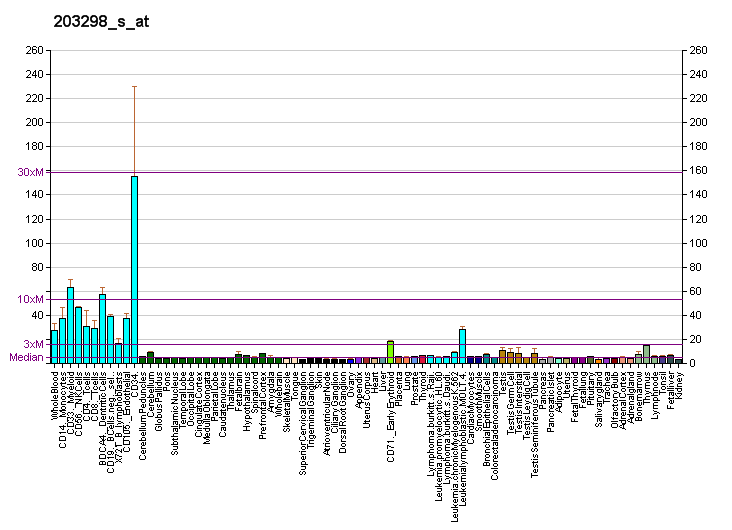
RNA expression pattern
| Bgee | Human / Mouse (ortholog); Top expressed in: secondary oocyte; buccal mucosa cell; sperm; gingival epithelium; trabecular bone; nipple; amniotic fluid; dorsal motor nucleus of vagus nerve; tendon of biceps brachii; Brodmann area 23 / Top expressed in: Rostral migratory stream; internal carotid artery; external carotid artery; tail of embryo; renal corpuscle; secondary oocyte; zygote; medullary collecting duct; gastrula; hair follicle; More reference expression data |
| BioGPS | More reference expression data |
Gene ontology
| Molecular function | DNA binding; RNA polymerase II transcription regulatory region sequence-specific DNA binding; chromatin binding; histone demethylase activity; DNA-binding transcription repressor activity, RNA polymerase II-specific; transcription factor binding; protein binding; DNA-binding transcription factor activity, RNA polymerase II-specific; methylated histone binding; histone H3-tri/di/monomethyl-lysine-4 demethylase activity |
| Cellular component | ESC/E(Z) complex; nucleoplasm; nucleus; histone methyltransferase complex; mitochondrion |
| Biological process | cell differentiation; negative regulation of histone methylation; regulation of transcription, DNA-templated; thymus development; negative regulation of transcription by RNA polymerase II; spleen development; transcription, DNA-templated; stem cell differentiation; multicellular organism development; central nervous system development; negative regulation of gene expression, epigenetic; regulation of cell population proliferation; liver development; negative regulation of transcription, DNA-templated; negative regulation of cell population proliferation; positive regulation of histone H3-K9 methylation; negative regulation of cardiac muscle hypertrophy; cellular response to leukemia inhibitory factor; negative regulation of cardiac muscle cell proliferation; chromatin organization; histone demethylation; chromatin remodeling; histone H3-K4 demethylation, trimethyl-H3-K4-specific |
Sources:Amigo / QuickGO
Orthologs
| Databases | NCBI: entry; OMA: entry |
| Species | Human | Mouse |
| Entrez | 3720 | 16468 |
| Ensembl | ENSG00000008083 | ENSMUSG00000038518 |
| UniProt | Q92833 | Q62315 |
| RefSeq (mRNA) | NM_001267040; NM_004973 | NM_001205043; NM_001205044; NM_021878; NM_001360281 |
| RefSeq (protein) | NP_001253969; NP_004964 | NP_001191972; NP_001191973; NP_068678; NP_001347210 |
| Location (UCSC) | Chr 6: 15.25 – 15.52 Mb | Chr 13: 44.88 – 45.08 Mb |
| PubMed search |
- Wikidata
| View/Edit Human | View/Edit Mouse |

Protein Jumonji is a protein that in humans is encoded by the JARID2 gene. JARID2 is a member of the alpha-ketoglutarate-dependent hydroxylase superfamily. It is a homologue of the mouse protein jumonji (jmj), which was named jūmonji for the Japanese word for cruciform, describing the shape of the abnormal neural grooves of jmj mutant mice.

Jarid2 (jumonji, AT rich interactive domain 2) is a protein coding gene that functions as a putative transcription factor. Distinguished as a nuclear protein necessary for mouse embryogenesis, Jarid2 is a member of the jumonji family that contains a DNA binding domain known as the AT-rich interaction domain (ARID). In vitro studies of Jarid2 reveal that ARID along with other functional domains are involved in DNA binding, nuclear localization, transcriptional repression, and recruitment of Polycomb-repressive complex 2 (PRC2). Intracellular mechanisms underlying these interactions remain largely unknown.

In search of developmentally important genes, Jarid2 has previously been identified by gene trap technology as an important factor necessary for organ development. During mouse organogenesis, Jarid2 is involved in the formation of the neural tube and development of the liver, spleen, thymus and cardiovascular system. Continuous Jarid2 expression in the tissues of the heart, highlight its presiding role in the development of both the embryonic and the adult heart. Mutant models of Jarid2 embryos show severe heart malformations, ventricular septal defects, noncompaction of the ventricular wall, and atrial enlargement. Homozygous mutants of Jarid2 are found to die soon after birth. Overexpression of the mouse Jarid2 gene has been reported to repress cardiomyocyte proliferation through it close interaction with retinoblastoma protein (Rb), a master cell cycle regulator. Retinoblastoma-binding protein-2 and the human SMCX protein share regions of homology between mice and humans.
