= JMJD6 =

Protein-coding gene in the species Homo sapiens

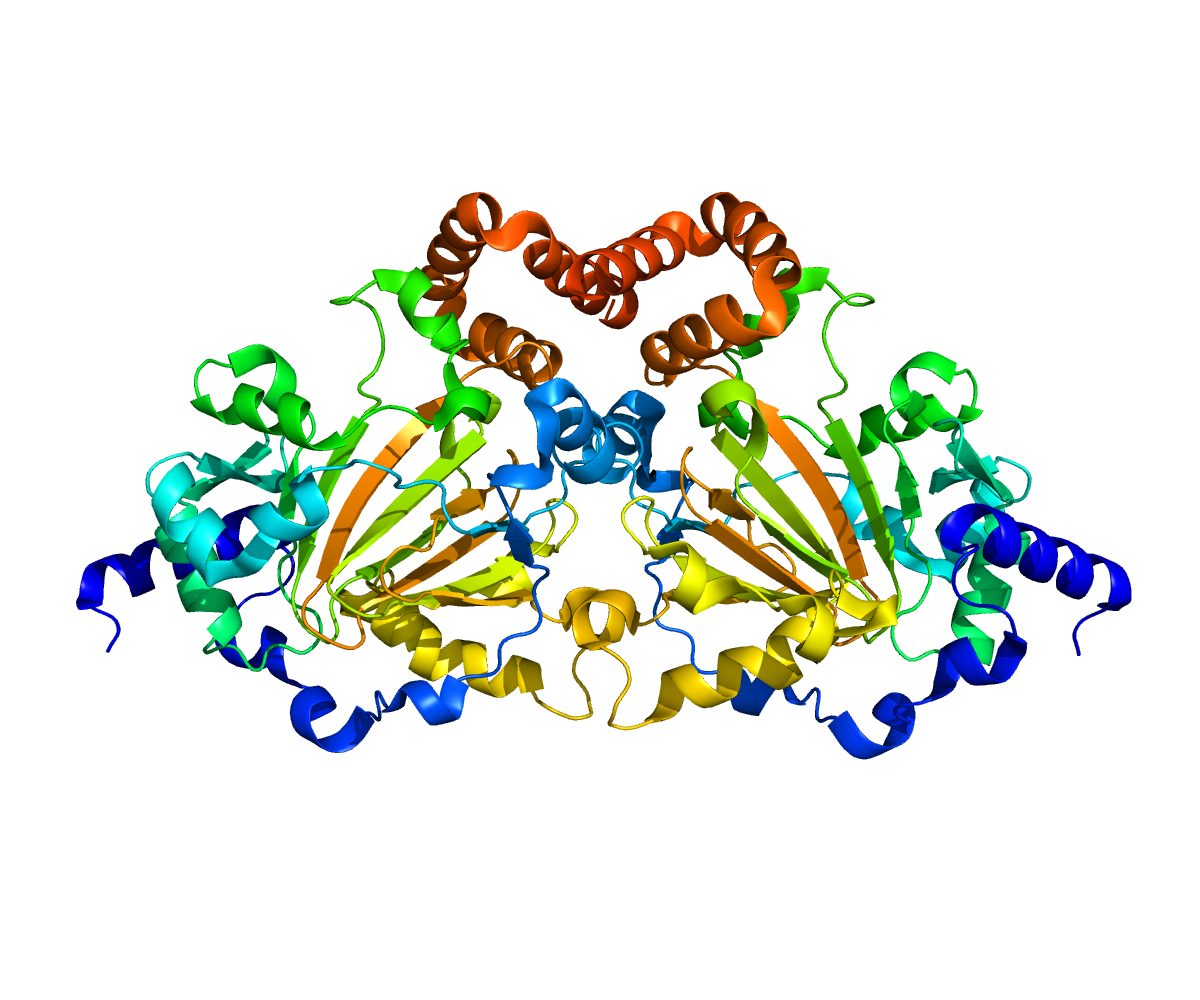

Identifiers
- Aliases: JMJD6, PSR, PTDSR, PTDSR1, arginine demethylase and lysine hydroxylase, jumonji domain containing 6, arginine demethylase and lysine hydroxylase
- External IDs: OMIM: 604914; MGI: 1858910; GeneCards: JMJD6
Available structures
PDB	Ortholog search: PDBe RCSB
PDB	List of PDB id codes 3K2O, 3LD8, 3LDB

Gene location (Human)
Chr.	Chromosome 17 (human)
Band	17q25.1	Start	76,712,832 bp
Band	17q25.1	End	76,726,799 bp

Gene location (Mouse)
Chr.	Chromosome 11 (mouse)
Band	11 E2|11 81.49 cM	Start	116,728,258 bp
Band	11 E2|11 81.49 cM	End	116,734,275 bp
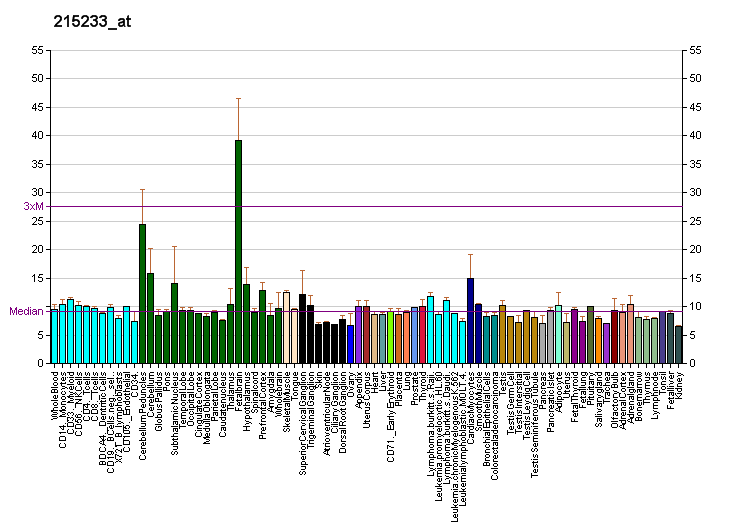

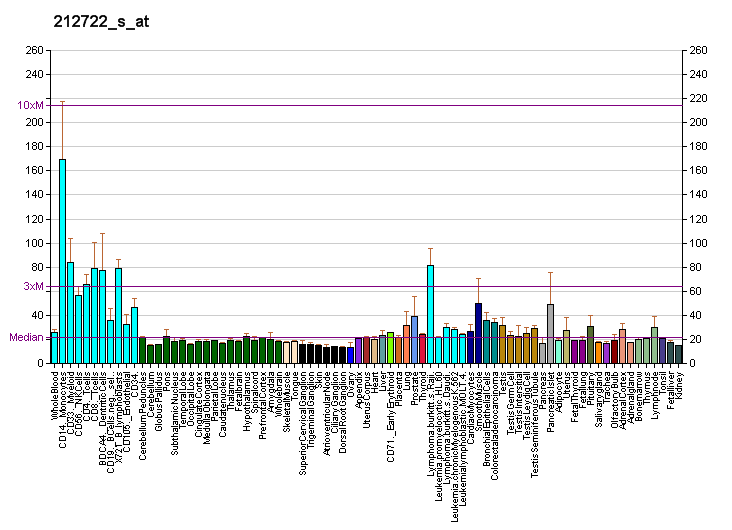
RNA expression pattern
Bgee	Human / Mouse (ortholog); Top expressed in: saphenous vein; vena cava; gastric mucosa; muscle layer of sigmoid colon; trachea; pericardium; popliteal artery; tibial arteries; right auricle of heart; anterior pituitary / Top expressed in: otic vesicle; otic placode; saccule; yolk sac; epiblast; morula; zygote; embryo; embryo; granulocyte; More reference expression data
BioGPS	More reference expression data
Gene ontology
Molecular function	iron ion binding; protein homodimerization activity; dioxygenase activity; metal ion binding; histone H3-methyl-arginine-2 demethylase activity; protein binding; histone H3-methyl-arginine-3 demethylase activity; single-stranded RNA binding; RNA binding; identical protein binding; oxidoreductase activity; peptidyl-lysine 5-dioxygenase activity; histone demethylase activity; signaling receptor activity; transcription coactivator activity; demethylase activity; oxidative RNA demethylase activity; P-TEFb complex binding
Cellular component	cytosol; plasma membrane; nucleoplasm; nucleolus; nucleus; ribonucleoprotein complex; cytoplasm
Biological process	recognition of apoptotic cell; cell differentiation; regulation of transcription, DNA-templated; T cell differentiation in thymus; kidney development; lung development; histone H3-R2 demethylation; mRNA processing; sprouting angiogenesis; regulation of mRNA splicing, via spliceosome; transcription, DNA-templated; histone H4-R3 demethylation; multicellular organism development; apoptotic cell clearance; development of the heart; cell surface receptor signaling pathway; blood vessel development; retina development in camera-type eye; RNA splicing; macrophage activation; peptidyl-lysine hydroxylation to 5-hydroxy-L-lysine; erythrocyte development; chromatin organization; positive regulation of transcription, DNA-templated; protein demethylation; oxidative RNA demethylation; positive regulation of transcription by RNA polymerase II; protein homooligomerization
Sources:Amigo / QuickGO
Orthologs
Databases	NCBI: entry; OMA: entry
Species	Human	Mouse
Entrez	23210	107817
Ensembl	ENSG00000070495	ENSMUSG00000056962
UniProt	Q6NYC1	Q9ERI5
RefSeq (mRNA)	NM_001081461; NM_015167	NM_033398; NM_001363363
RefSeq (protein)	NP_001074930; NP_055982	NP_203971; NP_001350292
Location (UCSC)	Chr 17: 76.71 – 76.73 Mb	Chr 11: 116.73 – 116.73 Mb
PubMed search
- Wikidata
View/Edit Human	View/Edit Mouse

Bifunctional arginine demethylase and lysyl-hydroxylase JMJD6 is an enzyme that in humans is encoded by the JMJD6 gene.

== Function ==
This gene encodes a nuclear protein with a JmjC domain. JmjC domain-containing proteins belong to the alpha-ketoglutarate-dependent hydroxylase superfamily. They are predicted to function as protein hydroxylases or histone demethylases. This protein was first identified as a putative phosphatidylserine receptor involved in phagocytosis of apoptotic cells. Subsequent studies suggest that the protein may cross-react with a monoclonal antibody that recognizes the phosphatidylserine receptor and does not directly function in the clearance of apoptotic cells. Multiple transcript variants encoding different isoforms have been found for this gene. On a physiological level JMJD6 has a role in angiogenesis, the process of vessel formation, whereas further roles of JMJD6 in pathophysiological processes were implicated, such as mammary tumorigenesis. Here, elevated JMJD6 level were found in breast cancer associated with aggressiveness and metastasis in mice.
