= ZNF224 =

Protein-coding gene in the species Homo sapiens

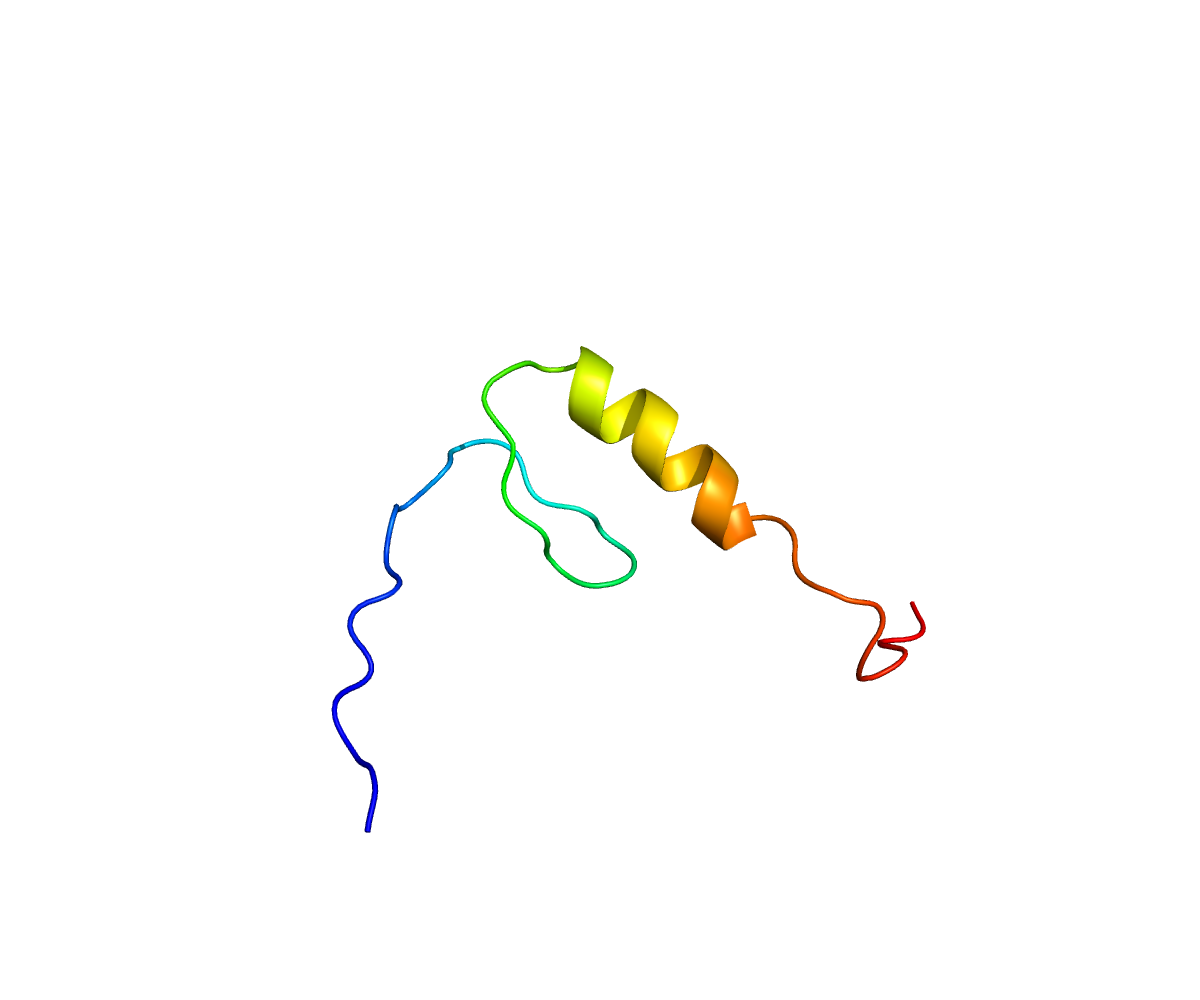

Identifiers
- Aliases: ZNF224, BMZF-2, BMZF2, KOX22, ZNF255, ZNF27, ZNF233, zinc finger protein 224
- External IDs: OMIM: 194555; GeneCards: ZNF224
Available structures
PDB	Human UniProt search: PDBe RCSB
PDB	List of PDB id codes 2ELY, 2ELZ, 2EM0, 2EM6, 2EM7, 2EM8, 2EM9, 2EN1, 2EN8, 2ENA, 2ENC, 2EOQ, 2EOR, 2EQ4, 2YSP, 2YTH

Gene location (Human)
Chr.	Chromosome 19 (human)
Band	19q13.31	Start	44,094,361 bp
Band	19q13.31	End	44,109,886 bp
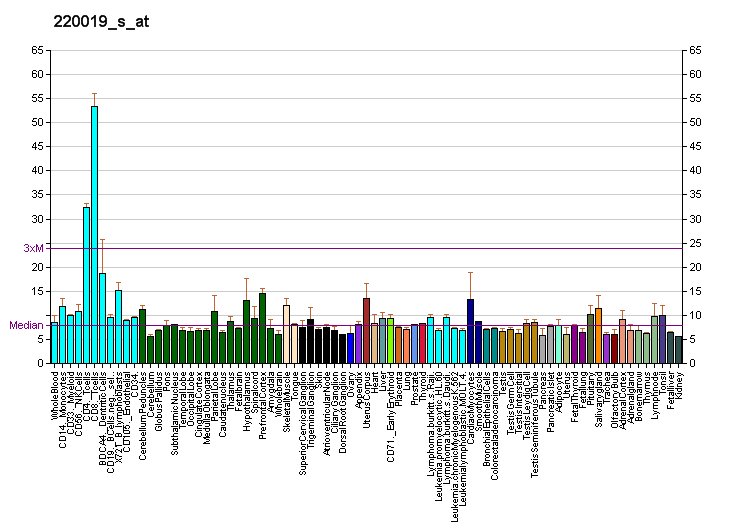
RNA expression pattern
Bgee	Human / Mouse (ortholog); Top expressed in: cerebellar hemisphere; right hemisphere of cerebellum; rectum; gastric mucosa; right uterine tube; left ovary; spleen; left lobe of thyroid gland; right ovary; right lobe of thyroid gland / n/a; More reference expression data
BioGPS	More reference expression data
Gene ontology
Molecular function	protein binding; nucleic acid binding; DNA-binding transcription factor activity; metal ion binding; DNA binding; DNA-binding transcription repressor activity, RNA polymerase II-specific; sequence-specific DNA binding; DNA-binding transcription factor activity, RNA polymerase II-specific
Cellular component	nucleus; intracellular anatomical structure; nuclear membrane; transcription repressor complex
Biological process	negative regulation of transcription, DNA-templated; regulation of transcription, DNA-templated; transcription, DNA-templated; negative regulation of transcription by RNA polymerase II
Sources:Amigo / QuickGO
Orthologs
Databases	NCBI: entry; OMA: entry
Species	Human	Mouse
Entrez	7767	n/a
Ensembl	ENSG00000267680	n/a
UniProt	Q9NZL3	n/a
RefSeq (mRNA)	NM_013398; NM_001321645	n/a
RefSeq (protein)	NP_001308574; NP_037530	n/a
Location (UCSC)	Chr 19: 44.09 – 44.11 Mb	n/a
PubMed search		n/a
- Wikidata
View/Edit Human

Zinc finger protein 224 is a protein that in humans is encoded by the ZNF224 gene.
