= Epigenetic clock =

Biochemical test for age

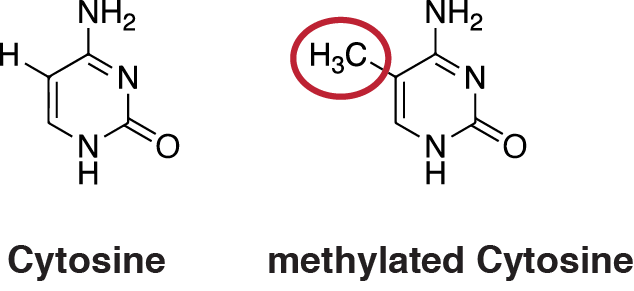
DNA methylation

An epigenetic clock is an analytical method used as a biomarker of aging to estimate "biological age." The method relies on age-related modifications to DNA that occur over time and regulate how genes are expressed. Many epigenetic clocks are based on the analysis of DNA methylation, measuring the accumulation of methyl groups to CpG regions of DNA molecules. More recently, new epigenetic clocks have been developed based on the histone code, chromatin accessibility and nucleosome positioning.

== History ==
The strong correlation between aging and DNA methylation levels has been known since the late 1960s. A vast literature describes sets of CpGs whose DNA methylation levels correlate with age. The first robust demonstration that DNA methylation levels in saliva could generate age predictors with an average accuracy of 5.2 years was published by a UCLA team including Sven Bocklandt, Steve Horvath, and Eric Vilain in 2011 (Bocklandt et al. 2011). The laboratories of Trey Ideker and Kang Zhang at the University of California, San Diego published the Hannum epigenetic clock (Hannum 2013), which consisted of 71 markers that accurately estimate age based on blood methylation levels. The first multi-tissue epigenetic clock, Horvath's epigenetic clock, was developed by Steve Horvath, a professor of human genetics and biostatistics at UCLA (Horvath 2013). Horvath spent over 4 years collecting publicly available Illumina DNA methylation data and identifying suitable statistical methods.

The age estimator was developed using 8,000 samples from 82 Illumina DNA methylation array datasets, encompassing 51 healthy tissues and cell types. The major innovation of Horvath's epigenetic clock lies in its wide applicability: the same set of 353 CpGs and the same prediction algorithm is used irrespective of the DNA source within the organism, i.e. it does not require any adjustments or offsets. This property allows one to compare the ages of different areas of the human body using the same aging clock. Shortly afterwards, a derivation of Horvath's clock, the IEAA (Intrinsic Epigenetic Age Acceleration), an estimator based on the cellular composition of the blood, was developed.

A second generation of DNA methylation clocks emerged a few years later and improved on the first in age estimation. This was thanks to the incorporation not only of epigenetic variants such as DNA methylation but also environmental variants such as smoking and age-related clinical phenotypes. Among these clocks, the PhenoAge and GrimAge clocks stand out. PhenoAge is an epigenetic clock that takes into account phenotypic age measures, rather than chronological age, to predict biological age. GrimAge uses the mortality risks of age together with the smoking variant among others as a risk factor. Taking into account environmental variants allows GrimAge to outperform any other epigenetic clock in "predicting death".

Third-generation DNA methylation clocks are designed to be applicable across multiple species simultaneously. Specifically, pan-mammalian epigenetic clocks determine the age of tissues from all mammalian species by analyzing cytosine methylation in DNA regions that are highly conserved.

New epigenetic clocks based on other markers continue being developed. An aging clock based on nucleosome positioning derived from cell-free DNA was introduced in 2024. In 2025, age-related changes in histone marks have been leveraged to build a new class of epigenetic clocks histone modifications. These new predictors show promise as an alternative to clocks that use cytosine methylation. New age estimation tools are being developed continuously, which also facilitate the prognosis of certain diseases.

== Most robustly age associated loci ==
=== ELOVL2 ===
Elongation Of Very Long Chain Fatty Acids-Like 2 is a gene that codes for a transmembrane protein that plays a role in the synthesis of VLCFAs. The inhibition of its expression has been associated with increased aging of the retina in mice while its upregulation resulted in a slower aging of the retina. Methylation sites in the promoter region of this gene have consistently been part of the top most age correlated in different studies. The methylation in those sites increases with age which reduce its expression.

=== FHL2 ===
Four-and-a-Half LIM domain protein 2 is a gene implicated in signal transduction. Increase in its expression has been associated with obesity. The methylation in its promoter is also strongly correlated with age in numerous studies. In this case the methylation, which increases with age, is associated with an increase in FHL2 expression but surprisingly also with a decreased expression in some tissues.

== Relationship to a cause of biological aging ==
It is not yet known what exactly is measured by DNA methylation age. Horvath hypothesized that DNA methylation age measures the cumulative effect of an epigenetic maintenance system but details are unknown. The fact that DNA methylation age of blood predicts all-cause mortality in later life has been used to argue that it relates to a process that causes aging. However, if a particular CpG played a direct causal role in the aging process, the mortality it created would make it less likely to be observed in older individuals, making the site less likely to have been chosen as a predictor; the 353 clock CpGs, therefore, likely have no causal effect. Rather, the epigenetic clock captures an emergent property of the epigenome. On the other hand, the aging clock based on nucleosome positioning is linked to a mechanistic effect of increasing of average genomic distances between nucleosomes with aging.

=== Epigenetic clock theory of aging ===
In 2010, Axel Schumacher proposed a new unifying model of aging and the development of complex diseases, incorporating classical aging theories and epigenetics. Steve Horvath and Kenneth Raj extended this theory, proposing an epigenetic clock theory of aging with the following tenets:

- Biological aging results as an unintended consequence of both developmental programs and maintenance program, the molecular footprints of which give rise to DNA methylation age estimators.
- The precise mechanisms linking the innate molecular processes (underlying DNAm age) to the decline in tissue function probably relate to both intracellular changes (leading to a loss of cellular identity) and subtle changes in cell composition, for example, fully functioning somatic stem cells.
- At the molecular level, DNAm age is a proximal readout of a collection of innate aging processes that conspire with other, independent root causes of aging to the detriment of tissue function.

== Motivation for biological clocks ==
In general, biological aging clocks and biomarkers of aging are expected to find many uses in biological research since age is a fundamental characteristic of most organisms. Accurate measures of biological age (biological aging clocks) could be useful for

- testing the validity of various theories of biological aging,
- diagnosing various age related diseases and for defining cancer subtypes,
- predicting/prognosticating the onset of various diseases,
- serving as surrogate markers for evaluating therapeutic interventions including rejuvenation approaches,
- studying developmental biology and cell differentiation,
- forensic applications, for example to estimate the age of a suspect based on blood left on a crime scene.

Overall, biological clocks are expected to be useful for studying what causes aging and what can be done against it. However, they can only capture the effects of interventions that affect the rate of future aging, i.e. the slope of the Gompertz curve by which mortality increases with age, and not that of interventions that act at one moment in time, e.g. to lower mortality across all ages, i.e. the intercept of the Gompertz curve.

== Properties of Horvath's clock ==
The clock is defined as an age estimation method based on 353 epigenetic markers on the DNA. The 353 markers measure DNA methylation of CpG dinucleotides. Estimated age ("predicted age" in mathematical usage), also referred to as DNA methylation age, has the following properties: first, it is close to zero for embryonic and induced pluripotent stem cells; second, it correlates with cell passage number; third, it gives rise to a highly heritable measure of age acceleration; and, fourth, it is applicable to chimpanzee tissues (which are used as human analogs for biological testing purposes). Organismal growth (and concomitant cell division) leads to a high ticking rate of the epigenetic clock that slows down to a constant ticking rate (linear dependence) after adulthood (age 20). The fact that DNA methylation age of blood predicts all-cause mortality in later life even after adjusting for known risk factors is compatible with a variety of causal relationships, e.g. a common cause for both. Similarly, markers of physical and mental fitness are associated with the epigenetic clock (lower abilities associated with age acceleration). It systematically underestimates age from older individuals.

Salient features of Horvath's epigenetic clock include its applicability to a broad spectrum of tissues and cell types. Since it allows one to contrast the ages of different tissues from the same subject, it can be used to identify tissues that show evidence of accelerated age due to disease.

=== Genetic estimators in the Horvath clock ===
The Horvath clock, specifically the IEAA variant, is associated with several ageing-related genes:14

- TRIM59: of the tripartite motif family, strongly associated with chronological age and whose expression has been observed in multiple cancers
- SMC4: inhibits cellular senescence, an established hallmark of ageing
- KPNA4: member of the importin family, nuclear transport receptors. Dysfunction of nuclear transport has been proposed as a marker of ageing
- CD46: encodes a regulator of T-cell function and the complement system, a key component of the innate immune system where it promotes inflammation
- ATP8B4: encodes for a lipid transporter protein and contains variants that have been reported in association with Alzheimer's disease
- CXXC4: encodes Idax, an inhibitor of Wnt signalling

=== Statistical approach ===
The basic approach is to form a weighted average of the 353 clock CpGs, which is then transformed to DNAm age using a calibration function. The calibration function reveals that the epigenetic clock has a high ticking rate until adulthood, after which it slows to a constant ticking rate. Using the training data sets, Horvath used a penalized regression model (Elastic net regularization) to regress a calibrated version of chronological age on 21,369 CpG probes that were present both on the Illumina 450K and 27K platform and had fewer than 10 missing values. DNAm age is defined as estimated ("predicted") age. The elastic net predictor automatically selected 353 CpGs. 193 of the 353 CpGs correlate positively with age while the remaining 160 CpGs correlate negatively with age. R software and a freely available web-based tool can be found at the following webpage.

=== Accuracy ===
The median error of estimated age is 3.6 years across a wide spectrum of tissues and cell types, although this increases for older individuals The epigenetic clock performs well in heterogeneous tissues (for example, whole blood, peripheral blood mononuclear cells, cerebellar samples, occipital cortex, buccal epithelium, colon, adipose, kidney, liver, lung, saliva, uterine cervix, epidermis, muscle) as well as in individual cell types such as CD4 T cells, CD14 monocytes, glial cells, neurons, immortalized B cells, mesenchymal stromal cells. However, accuracy depends to some extent on the source of the DNA.

=== Comparison with other biological clocks ===
The epigenetic clock leads to a chronological age prediction that has a Pearson correlation coefficient of r = 0.96 with chronological age (Figure 2 in). Thus the age correlation is close to its maximum possible correlation value of 1. Other biological clocks are based on a) telomere length, b) p16INK4a expression levels (also known as INK4a/ARF locus), and c) microsatellite mutations. The correlation between chronological age and telomere length is r = −0.51 in women and r = −0.55 in men. The correlation between chronological age and expression levels of p16INK4a in T cells is r = 0.56.

== Applications of epigenetic clocks ==
By contrasting DNA methylation age (estimated age) with chronological age, one can define measures of age acceleration. Age acceleration can be defined as the difference between DNA methylation age and chronological age. Alternatively, it can be defined as the residual that results from regressing DNAm age on chronological age. The latter measure is attractive because it does not correlate with chronological age. A positive/negative value of epigenetic age acceleration suggests that the underlying tissue ages faster/slower than expected.

=== Genetic studies of epigenetic age acceleration ===
The broad sense heritability (defined via Falconer's formula) of age acceleration of blood from older subjects is around 40% but it appears to be much higher in newborns. Similarly, the age acceleration of brain tissue (prefrontal cortex) was found to be 41% in older subjects. Genome-wide association studies (GWAS) of epigenetic age acceleration in postmortem brain samples have identified several SNPs at a genomewide significance level. GWAS of age acceleration in blood have identified several genome-wide significant genetic loci including the telomerase reverse transcriptase gene (TERT) locus. Genetic variants associated with longer leukocyte telomere length in TERT gene paradoxically confer higher epigenetic age acceleration in blood.

=== Lifestyle factors ===
In general, lifestyle factors have only weak associations with epigenetic age acceleration in blood. Cross sectional studies of extrinsic epigenetic aging rates in blood show reduced epigenetic aging correlates with higher education, eating a high plant diet with lean meats, moderate alcohol consumption, and physical activity and the risks associated with metabolic syndrome. However, studies suggest that high levels of alcohol consumption are associated with accelerated aging of certain epigenetic clocks.

=== Obesity and metabolic syndrome ===
The epigenetic clock was used to study the relationship between high body mass index (BMI) and the DNA methylation ages of human blood, liver, muscle and adipose tissue. A significant correlation (r = 0.42) between BMI and epigenetic age acceleration could be observed for the liver. A much larger sample size (n = 4200 blood samples) revealed a weak but statistically significant correlation (r = 0.09) between BMI and intrinsic age acceleration of blood. The same large study found that various biomarkers of metabolic syndrome (glucose-, insulin-, triglyceride levels, C-reactive protein, waist-to-hip ratio) were associated with epigenetic age acceleration in blood. Conversely, high levels of HDL cholesterol were associated with a lower epigenetic aging rate of blood. Other research suggests very strong associations between higher body mass index, waist-to-hip ratio, and waist circumference and accelerated epigenetic clocks, with evidence that physical activity may lessen these effects.

=== Female breast tissue is older than expected ===
DNAm age is higher than chronological age in female breast tissue that is adjacent to breast cancer tissue. Since normal tissue which is adjacent to other cancer types does not exhibit a similar age acceleration effect, this finding suggests that normal female breast tissue ages faster than other parts of the body. Similarly, normal breast tissue samples from women without cancer have been found to be substantially older than blood samples collected from the same women at the same time.

=== Breast cancer ===
In a study of three epigenetic clocks and breast cancer risk, DNAm age was found to be accelerated in blood samples of cancer-free women, years before diagnosis.

=== Cancer tissue ===
Cancer tissues show both positive and negative age acceleration effects. For most tumor types, no significant relationship can be observed between age acceleration and tumor morphology (grade/stage). On average, cancer tissues with mutated TP53 have a lower age acceleration than those without it. Further, cancer tissues with high age acceleration tend to have fewer somatic mutations than those with low age acceleration. Age acceleration is highly related to various genomic aberrations in cancer tissues. Somatic mutations in estrogen receptors or progesterone receptors are associated with accelerated DNAm age in breast cancer. Colorectal cancer samples with a BRAF (V600E) mutation or promoter hypermethylation of the mismatch repair gene MLH1 are associated with an increased age acceleration. Age acceleration in glioblastoma multiforme samples is highly significantly associated with certain mutations in H3F3A. One study suggests that the epigenetic age of blood tissue may be prognostic of lung cancer incidence.

=== Trisomy 21 (Down syndrome) ===
Down syndrome entails an increased risk of many chronic diseases that are typically associated with older age. The clinical manifestations of accelerated aging suggest that trisomy 21 increases the biological age of tissues, but molecular evidence for this hypothesis has been sparse. According to the epigenetic clock, trisomy 21 significantly increases the age of blood and brain tissue (on average by 6.6 years).

=== Alzheimer's disease related neuropathology ===
Epigenetic age acceleration of the human prefrontal cortex was found to be correlated with several neuropathological measurements that play a role in Alzheimer's disease. Further, it was found to be associated with a decline in global cognitive functioning, and memory functioning among individuals with Alzheimer's disease. The epigenetic age of blood relates to cognitive functioning in the elderly. Overall, these results strongly suggest that the epigenetic clock lends itself for measuring the biological age of the brain.

=== Cerebellum ages slowly ===
It has been difficult to identify tissues that seem to evade aging due to the lack of biomarkers of tissue age that allow one to contrast compare the ages of different tissues. An application of epigenetic clock to 30 anatomic sites from six centenarians and younger subjects revealed that the cerebellum ages slowly: it is about 15 years younger than expected in a centenarian. This finding might explain why the cerebellum exhibits fewer neuropathological hallmarks of age related dementias compared to other brain regions. In younger subjects (e.g. younger than 70), brain regions and brain cells appear to have roughly the same age. Several SNPs and genes have been identified that relate to the epigenetic age of the cerebellum.

=== Huntington's disease ===
Huntington's disease has been found to increase the epigenetic aging rates of several human brain regions.

=== Centenarians age slowly ===
The offspring of semi-supercentenarians (subjects who reached an age of 105–109 years) have a lower epigenetic age than age-matched controls (age difference = 5.1 years in blood) and centenarians are younger (8.6 years) than expected based on their chronological age.

=== HIV and SIV infection ===
Infection with the Human Immunodeficiency Virus-1 (HIV) is associated with clinical symptoms of accelerated aging, as evidenced by increased incidence and diversity of age-related illnesses at relatively young ages. But it has been difficult to detect an accelerated aging effect on a molecular level. An epigenetic clock analysis of human DNA from HIV+ subjects and controls detected a significant age acceleration effect in brain (7.4 years) and blood (5.2 years) tissue due to HIV-1 infection. These results are consistent with an independent study that also found an age advancement of 5 years in blood of HIV patients and a strong effect of the HLA locus. A progressing infection with Simian Immunodeficiency Virus in rhesus macaque (SIVmac) - a non-human primate model of AIDS - causes epigenetic age acceleration in PBMCs and internal tissues.

=== Parkinson's disease ===
A large-scale study suggests that the blood of Parkinson's disease subjects, in particular, their granulocyte ratio, exhibits (relatively weak) accelerated aging effects.

=== Developmental disorder: syndrome X ===
Children with a very rare disorder known as syndrome X maintain the façade of persistent toddler-like features while aging from birth to adulthood. Since the physical development of these children is dramatically delayed, these children appear to be a toddler or at best a preschooler. According to an epigenetic clock analysis, blood tissue from syndrome X cases is not younger than expected.

=== Menopause accelerates epigenetic aging ===
The following results strongly suggest that the loss of female hormones resulting from menopause accelerates the epigenetic aging rate of blood and possibly that of other tissues. First, early menopause has been found to be associated with an increased epigenetic age acceleration of blood. Second, surgical menopause (due to bilateral oophorectomy) is associated with epigenetic age acceleration in blood and saliva. Third, menopausal hormone therapy, which mitigates hormonal loss, is associated with a negative age acceleration of buccal cells (but not of blood cells). Fourth, genetic markers that are associated with early menopause are also associated with increased epigenetic age acceleration in blood.

=== Cellular senescence versus epigenetic aging ===
A confounding aspect of biological aging is the nature and role of senescent cells. It is unclear whether the three major types of cellular senescence, namely replicative senescence, oncogene-induced senescence and DNA damage-induced senescence are descriptions of the same phenomenon instigated by different sources, or if each of these is distinct, and how they are associated with epigenetic aging. Induction of replicative senescence (RS) and oncogene-induced senescence (OIS) were found to be accompanied by epigenetic aging of primary cells but senescence induced by DNA damage was not, even though RS and OIS activate the cellular DNA damage response pathway. These results highlight the independence of cellular senescence from epigenetic aging. Consistent with this, telomerase-immortalised cells continued to age (according to the epigenetic clock) without having been treated with any senescence inducers or DNA-damaging agents, re-affirming the independence of the process of epigenetic ageing from telomeres, cellular senescence, and the DNA damage response pathway. Although the uncoupling of senescence from cellular aging appears at first sight to be inconsistent with the fact that senescent cells contribute to the physical manifestation of organism ageing, as demonstrated by Baker et al., where removal of senescent cells slowed down aging.

The epigenetic clock analysis of senescence, however, suggests that cellular senescence is a state that cells are forced into as a result of external pressures such as DNA damage, ectopic oncogene expression and exhaustive proliferation of cells to replenish those eliminated by external/environmental factors. These senescent cells, in sufficient numbers, will probably cause the deterioration of tissues, which is interpreted as organism ageing. However, at the cellular level, aging, as measured by the epigenetic clock, is distinct from senescence. It is an intrinsic mechanism that exists from the birth of the cell and continues. This implies that if cells are not shunted into senescence by the external pressures described above, they would still continue to age. This is consistent with the fact that mice with naturally long telomeres still age and eventually die even though their telomere lengths are far longer than the critical limit, and they age prematurely when their telomeres are forcibly shortened, due to replicative senescence. Therefore, cellular senescence is a route by which cells exit prematurely from the natural course of cellular aging.

=== Effect of sex and race/ethnicity ===
Men age faster than women according to epigenetic age acceleration in blood, brain, saliva, but it depends on the structure being researched and the lifestyle. The epigenetic clock method applies to all examined racial/ethnic groups in the sense that DNAm age is highly correlated with chronological age. But ethnicity can be associated with epigenetic age acceleration. For example, the blood of Hispanics and the Tsimané ages more slowly than that of other populations which might explain the Hispanic mortality paradox.

=== Rejuvenation effect due to stem cell transplantation in blood ===
Hematopoietic stem cell transplantation, which transplants these cells from a young donor to an older recipient, rejuvenates the epigenetic age of blood to that of the donor. However, graft-versus-host disease is associated with increased DNA methylation age.

=== Progeria ===
Adult progeria also known as Werner syndrome is associated with epigenetic age acceleration in blood. Fibroblast samples from children with Hutchinson-Gilford Progeria exhibit accelerated epigenetic aging effects according to the "skin & blood" epigenetic clock but not according to the original pan tissue clock from Horvath.

== Biological mechanism behind the epigenetic clock ==
=== Possible explanation 1: Epigenomic maintenance system ===
Horvath hypothesized that his clock arises from a methylation footprint left by an epigenomic maintenance system.

=== Possible explanation 2: Unrepaired DNA damages ===
Endogenous DNA damages occur frequently including about 50 double-strand DNA breaks per cell cycle and about 10,000 oxidative damages per day (see DNA damage (naturally occurring)). During repair of double-strand breaks many epigenetic alterations are introduced, and in a percentage of cases epigenetic alterations remain after repair is completed, including increased methylation of CpG island promoters. Similar, but usually transient epigenetic alterations were recently found during repair of oxidative damages caused by H_{2}O_{2}, and it was suggested that occasionally these epigenetic alterations may also remain after repair. These accumulated epigenetic alterations may contribute to the epigenetic clock. Accumulation of epigenetic alterations may parallel the accumulation of un-repaired DNA damages that are proposed to cause aging (see DNA damage theory of aging). In line with stochastic DNA damage accumulation, age-related alterations in DNA methylation have been observed to predominantly undergo stochastic changes as individuals age. This accumulation of stochastic variation has demonstrated sufficient capacity to build aging clocks, further supporting the notion that epigenetic changes may be driven by the gradual accrual of unprogrammed stochastic damage.
