= H3Q5dop =

Post-translational histone modifications involving dopamine

H3Q5dop (or H3Q5-dopaminylation) is an epigenetic modification to the DNA packaging protein Histone H3 that indicates dopaminylation of the glutamine residue at position 5 (Gln5 or Q5). In general, monoaminylation refers to the overall class of post-translational modifications involving monoamines; however, these reactions are further classified by the individual monoamine reactant they describe (i.e., dopaminylation, serotonylation, histaminylation).

To date, histone H3 is the only histone protein known to undergo dopaminylation modifications, which have only been reported for glutamine position 5 (Gln5) of histone H3 (hereafter referred to as H3Q5dop). As such, histone dopaminylation currently refers to the covalent addition of dopamine to glutamine at position 5 (Gln5) of histone H3.

Histone monoaminylation modifications (i.e., H3Q5-dopaminylation, H3Q5-serotonylation, H3Q5-histaminylation) are associated with a number of regulatory effects, no two of which appear to be the same. H3Q5dop in particular has remained a seldom explored topic since its discovery in 2020. Nevertheless, H3Q5dop has been reported in dopaminergic neurons of the nucleus accumbens (NAc), ventral tegmental area (VTA), and amygdala.

H3Q5-dopaminylation has been implicated in a variety of processes, including cocaine-induced transcriptional plasticity, heroin-induced transcriptional and behavioral plasticity, and drug-induced transcriptional and behavioral changes. Alongside H3Q5dop, the H3K4me3Q5dop modification has also been identified. Dopaminylation is known to influence both drug-seeking behaviors (i.e., cocaine, heroin) and differential gene expression programs associated with substance abuse, and has been associated with changes in epigenetic signatures within the limbic system following early-life stressful social experience (SSE) in rats.

== Identification ==
Protein monoaminylation was first identified in 1957 by Heinrich Waelsch and colleagues at Columbia University. After discovering that primary amines could be covalently incorporated into proteins via transamidation at glutamine residues, the group went on to uncover the enzyme catalyzing these reactions, effectively naming it "transglutaminase" after its function.

Despite its discovery in the mid-twentieth century, protein monoaminylation was not investigated as a post-translational modification until 2003, when Diego Walther and colleagues at the Max-Planck-Institute for Molecular Genetics revealed that serotonylation of small GTPases mediates ⍺-granule release during the activation and aggregation of platelets.

Notably, monoaminylation was not uncovered as an epigenetic regulatory mechanism until 2019, when Lorna Farrelly and colleagues at the Icahn School of Medicine reported the H3Q5-serotonylation (H3Q5ser) modification for the first time. Later, in 2020, the H3Q5-dopaminylation (H3Q5dop) modification was identified in the striatum by Ashley Lepack and colleagues also at the Icahn School of Medicine. Five years later, Qingfei Zheng and colleagues at Ohio State University discovered the H3Q5-histaminylation (H3Q5his) modification in histaminergic neurons.

== Mechanism ==
Dopaminylation is catalyzed by transglutaminase 2 (TGM2) in a calcium-dependent manner, and relies upon the intracellular bioavailability of dopamine substrates. Generally, protein dopaminylation occurs in the cytoplasm; however, histone dopaminylation only occurs within the nucleus. Nevertheless, the mechanism for TGM2-catalyzed dopaminylation is identical for both histone and non-histone proteins alike.

Structurally, Ca^{2+} binds directly to TGM2 itself and not to the substrate molecule. Once Ca^{2+} binds to TGM2, a 4 nm relaxation about the major axis of the protein exposes the active site to available substrates. The active site itself is composed of a well conserved catalytic triad (Cys277–His335–Asp358) situated within a substrate binding channel, which is bordered by two conserved residues (Trp241 and Trp332) that facilitate catalysis through stabilization of the transition state. Once intracellular Ca^{2+} binds to TGM2 and exposes the substrate binding channel, the glutamine residue (Gln5) of histone H3 is free to enter the enzyme active site. As a transamidation reaction, the mechanism for H3 dopaminylation can be summarized in two parts: an initial thioester formation, followed by isopeptide bond formation.

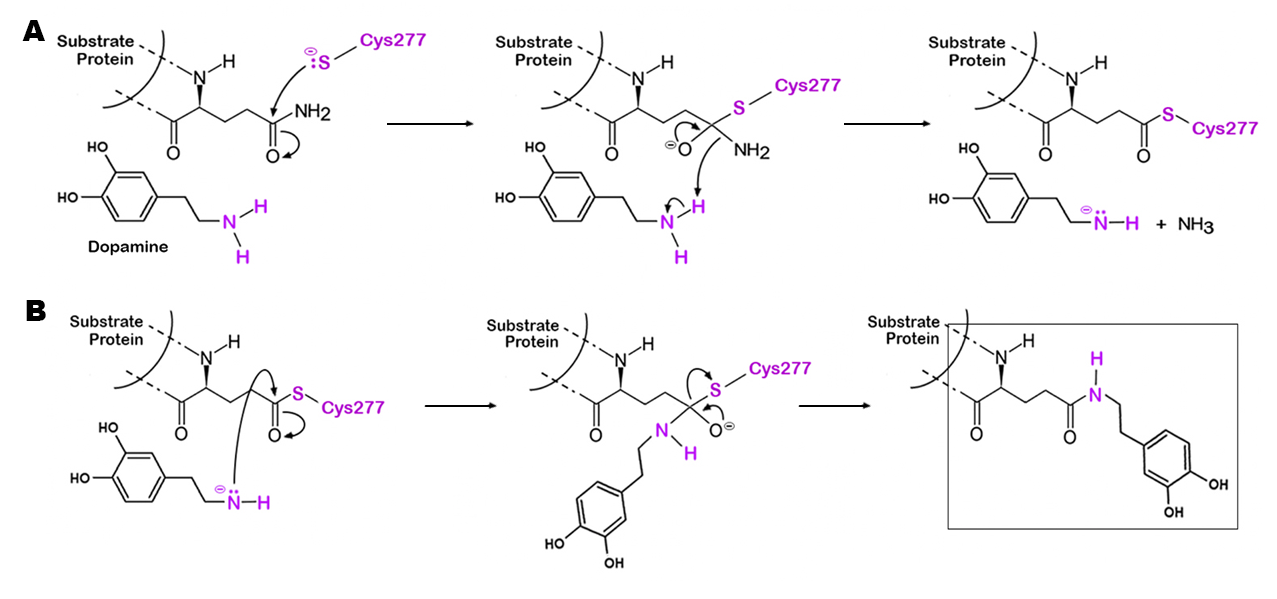

Fig. 1 Mechanism for Histone Dopaminylation
Dopaminylation is a two step, Ca^{2+}-dependent reaction in which TGM2 catalyzes the covalent attachment of dopamine onto a glutamine residue (Gln5) of Histone H3. (A) The catalytic cysteine residue (Cys277) of TGM2 facilitates an initial acyl transfer reaction, which is ultimately followed by isopeptide bond formation (B).

When intracellular Ca^{2+} and dopamine concentrations are sufficient, TGM2-catalyzed dopaminylation of histone H3 can occur. First, the catalytic cysteine residue (Cys277) in the TGM2 active site nucleophilically attacks the 𝛾-carboxamido group of the glutamine residue in an acyl transfer reaction (Fig. 1A), forming a thioester intermediate and releasing one molecule of ammonia (NH_{3}) as a result. Next, the deprotonated primary amine of the dopamine substrate nucleophilically attacks the 𝛾-thioester group of the intermediate, forming a stable isopeptide bond and ultimately releasing the enzyme (Fig. 1B).

== Functions ==
Recent studies have examined the role of dopaminylation modifications in the adult brain with respect to drug exposure (i.e., cocaine, heroin). In post-mortem human brain tissues, H3Q5dop levels were significantly reduced in the VTA of cocaine-dependent drug users, relative to matched controls. Interestingly, stable levels of H3K4me3Q5dop were also observed within the same area in the brains of cocaine-dependent drug users, along with relatively unchanged expression levels of H3K4me3, total histone H3, and TGM2. Moreover, histone dopaminylation was critically involved in modulating aberrant neuronal gene expression patterns in the VTA following cocaine consumption. Further investigations using a rodent model revealed that increased H3Q5dop levels following prolonged withdrawal from extended access to cocaine self-administration regulated relapse-like behaviors, thereby establishing a role for histone dopaminylation in orchestrating long-term behavioral outcomes in substance use disorder via modulation of epigenetic programs within the mesocortical dopaminergic pathway.

Monoaminylation	Tissue	Modification	Biological Function	References
Dopaminylation	Nucleus Accumbens (NAc)	H3Q5dop	Promotes cocaine-seeking behavior and regulates cocaine-induced gene expression programs	(Stewart et al., 2023)
Dopaminylation	Ventral Tegmental Area (VTA)	H3Q5dop	Promotes heroin-seeking behavior and regulates gene expression programs associated with heroin abstinence	(Fulton et al., 2022)
Dopaminylation	Amygdala	H3Q5dop	Modification was identified following early-life stressful social experience (SSE) in rat pups	(Rajan et al., 2023)
Dopaminylation	Ventral Tegmental Area (VTA)	H3Q5dop; H3K4me3Q5dop	Promotes relapse-like behavior and modulates neuronal gene expression patterns in the VTA following cocaine consumption	(Lepack et al., 2020)

In a study on the limbic system, low levels of trimethylation and dopaminylation of histone H3 at lysine position 4 (H3K4) and glutamine position 5 (H3Q5) in the amygdala led to failure in novel odor recognition for rat pups undergoing novel odor preference testing. However, the authors of this study omit whether such modifications were in fact detected concurrently (i.e., H3K4me3Q5dop). Nevertheless, scent recognition testing serves as a critical methodology for evaluating memory, cognitive function, and sensory perception in rodent models, and thus represents an important mechanism for evaluating changes in neurotransmission and epigenetic regulation in response to environmental conditions such as stress. Herein, failure to recognize novel odor was reportedly linked to increased dopamine transmission, decreased levels of TGM2, and increased histone trimethylation (H3K4me3) and dopaminylation (H3Q5dop) in the amygdala following exposure to early-life stressful social experience (SSE). It remains unclear whether the reported fluctuations in TGM2 levels could be attributed to changes in TGM2 expression levels or changes in TGM2 activity levels. Ambiguity aside, this data provides useful insight, as early-life adversity paradigms appear sufficient for reconfiguration of epigenetic signatures within the limbic system, thereby establishing stable, differential epigenetic programs which may contribute to lifelong susceptibility for affective psychopathologies (i.e., major depressive disorder, bipolar disorder, anxiety disorders).

== See also ==
- Histone Monoaminylation
- Protein Monoaminylation
- Dopaminylation
- Serotonylation
- Histaminylation
