= Bear Necessities Pediatric Foundation =

American nonprofit organization

- Formation: 1992
- Headquarters: Chicago, Illinois, US
- Chief executive officer: Kathleen Casey
- Vice president: Courtney Krupa
- Website: bearnecessities.org

Bear Necessities Pediatric Foundation is a nonprofit national organization that works with children who have cancer, and their families by providing resources and positive experiences. This organization was founded in memory of Barret "Bear" Krupa, a boy who had a wish to help other children and families with cancer. The Bear Necessities Pediatric Foundation has expanded into two main programs: Bear Discoveries, which focuses on funding for research, and Bear Hugs, which focuses on giving children and their families a positive experience.

== History ==
This foundation was established in Chicago in 1992 in honor of Barret "Bear" Krupa, an eight-year-old boy who lost his battle to Wilms' tumor in his kidneys six years after his diagnosis. Both bone marrow transplants and chemotherapy were tried. Despite the unsuccessful treatments, Bear had a high chance of survival. Kathleen Casey, Bear's mother, originally left her graphic design career to focus on raising her two children, but after her son's cancer diagnosis she decided to remain at home to continue to care for him. Bear was able to see the beginning of the foundation, although it was originally supplemental support to already existing programs in the hospitals and not the wide range of programs known later. A year after the foundation was created he died. Casey continued working for the foundation as CEO and expanded the program offerings in his honor. Later Bear's sister Courtney joined the foundation as vice president where she helps with day to day tasks as well as providing input into important decisions for the foundation.

== Bear Discoveries ==
Bear Discoveries is a program that hosts fundraising events, gives grants to young professionals, funds research that seeks to help find the cure for cancer. Bear Necessities has also formed partnerships with other non-profit cancer foundations such as "Journey 4 A Cure", who contributed $40,000 to the program in 2011.

One of the annual events is called "A Walk for the Bear", a three-mile walk along a trail where all participants are encouraged to dress in their Halloween costumes. Bear Discoveries has funded $4.5 million in medical research grants through this walk alone and all proceeds from this event go towards research efforts. Similarly, they host an annual "Santa Hustle 5k" at soldier field where all the participants are encouraged to wear Santa costumes. Another event, the "Shamrock Shave", is a St. Patrick’s Day themed day party that entails a traditional Irish dinner, entertainment, and the shaving of heads. Participants are able to register in groups by raising $150 per person being shaved in order to raise money for a charity of their choice. Founded in 2008, the 12th annual "Shamrock Shave" took place on March 14, 2020, with an expected turnout of 40 volunteers to shave their head.

A bigger annual event that Bear Discoveries hosts is the "Bear Tie Ball". The first Bear Tie Ball was in 1993. Each year the theme of the ball changes, with 2020's theme being 'Boots and Bling', and the $400 ticket including dinner, cocktail hour, guest speakers, awards, and auctions. Bear Necessities also hosts the "Little Black Dress Luncheon", a fundraising event that includes lunch, drinks, and auctions for tickets of $100 per person or $1,000 per table.

=== Research funded ===
A study looked deeper into the biology of various types of astrocytoma tumors, the most common cancer tumor found in children. Angela J. Sievert found that treatments need to be specifically altered to treat different mutations of the same gene. Another study looked into the most common brain tumor found in children: pediatric low-grade gliomas (PLGG). Both studies prompted the creation of personalized treatments, medications, and therapies for the children.

One grant funded a study on growth of brain tumors, both in children and in adults, called high-grade gliomas. The study found that brain function and nerve activity feeds the growth of the tumor, which provided an explanation for the low survival rates. Bear Necessities part funded research at the University of Michigan Medical School that has made extreme advances towards blocking the most common cancer causing gene, NOTCH1, while still preserving its useful functions through the finding of a protein, ZMIZ1, which activates the cancer function of Notch.

In 2014, funding aided research conducted by Rintaro Hashizume, which found that a mutation in a gene, known as H3F3A, played a role in the development of a rare and inoperable brain tumor: diffuse intrinsic pontine glioma (DIPG). This finding has made advancements toward a drug therapy treatment for an otherwise incurable tumor formed on the brain stem.

== Bear Hugs ==
Bear Hugs is a program that provides children across the nation with customized experiences based on their interests and capabilities. Bear Hugs also serves as a support system for their families by offering financial and emotional aid. Bear Hugs coordinates with the Bear Necessities Pediatric Foundation to create memorable and supportive experiences for the child and their family. Bear Hugs has provided experiences for more than 5,000 children since its start. Some of the experiences that the Bear Hugs program has been able to provide to children are: attend a Polar Express event, meet YouTube stars Collin and Devan Key, watch PAW Patrol Live, attend a Chicago Cubs game and meet Javier Baez, attend a Blackhawks game and meet Patrick Kane.

Bear Hugs also takes part in many events hosted by Bear Discoveries such as "A Walk for the Bear" and "The Little Black Dress Luncheon".
