= Axel Schumacher =

German epigenetics researcher (born 1969)

- Born: June 14, 1969 (age 57); Kreuztal, Germany
- Occupation: Biologist
- Website: Official website

Axel Schumacher (born June 14, 1969), is a German epigenetics researcher. He invented the first microarray technologies for epigenetic biomarker discovery, developed the epigenetic theory of aging with his research leading to the worldwide first proof of whole genome epigenetic abnormalities in Alzheimer's disease.

Alongside his work as a scientist he is a published author, a futurologist and as of July 2017, CEO and co-founder of the HLTH.network.

== Early life and education ==
Schumacher was born in Kreuztal, Germany in 1969. Schumacher was awarded with a PhD in biology from University of Cologne under the supervision of Robert Koch Prize laureate Walter Doerfler in 2002.

== Career ==
=== Epigenetics ===
Schumacher started his career in epigenetics as a visiting researcher at the laboratory of Wolf Reik at the Babraham Institute near Cambridge, England working on DNA methylation and genomic imprinting.

During his career he made several breakthrough discoveries including, how genomic imprinting is regulated by DNA methylation, the effect of in vitro manipulation on imprinted regions in the genome, the first description of 'epigenetic SNPs', the invention of single-cell epigenomics, with his research leading to the world's first proof of whole genome epigenetic abnormalities in Alzheimer's disease, indicating that the main predisposing factors for Alzheimer's disease, PSEN and APOE, have a high interindividual variation in humans, which could indicate they are prone to epigenetic abnormalities.

Schumacher invented the technology of 'epigenetic microarrays', a technology that transformed the research field and led to hundreds of research discoveries across the world, including the first worldwide proof of whole genome epigenetic changes in schizophrenia and bipolar disorder.

In 2010, Schumacher proposed the 'epigenetic theory of aging' a new unifying model of aging and the development of complex diseases, incorporating classical aging theories and epigenetics. His work on epigenetic drift and age-related epigenetic changes in mice and humans laid the foundation to the epigenetic clock theory of aging.

=== Other work ===
During the 1990s, Schumacher worked as comic book author and artist. Among others he worked alongside famous artists such as Russian painter Oleg Yudin on titles such as 'High Speed' and on various stories for the American science fiction and fantasy comics magazine Heavy Metal.
