= H3F3A =

Gene for histone H3.3 protein

H3-3A
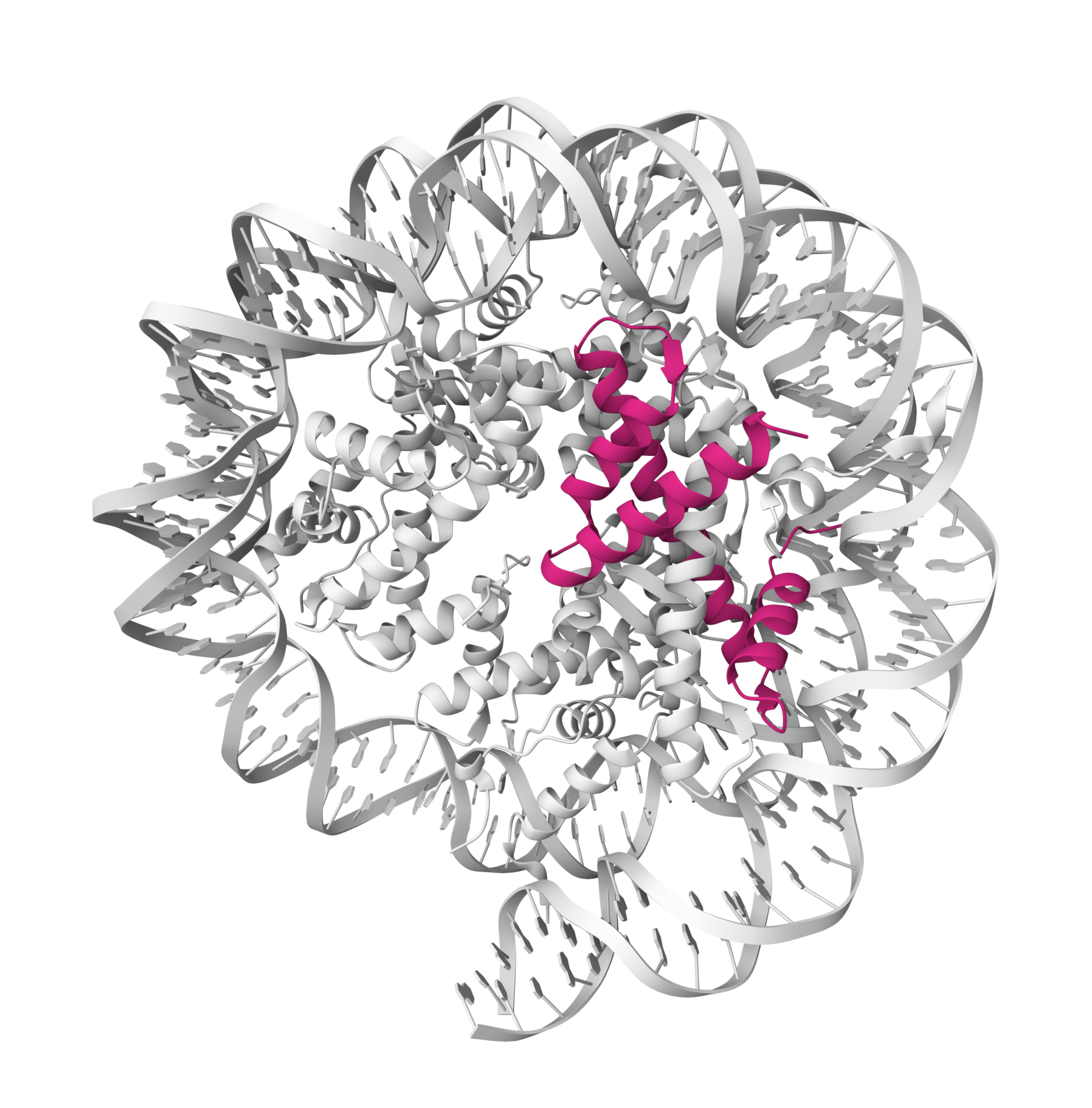

Identifiers
- Aliases: H3-3A, H3.3A, H3F3, H3 histone, family 3A, H3 histone family member 3A, H3.3 histone A, H3F3A, H3-3B
- External IDs: OMIM: 601128; MGI: 1097686; GeneCards: H3-3A
Available structures
PDB	Ortholog search: PDBe RCSB
PDB	List of PDB id codes 4H9O, 5BNX, 3JVK, 5DWQ, 4L58, 4TMP, 5DX0, 4H9S, 4W5A, 3AV2, 3WTP, 4HGA, 4GUS, 4GY5, 3MUK, 3QLC, 4H9Q, 4N4I, 4GU0, 4GNE, 5BNV, 2L43, 3MUL, 4H9P, 3QLA, 4QQ4, 4GNF, 4U7T, 3ASK, 4O62, 4GNG, 4GUR, 4H9N, 4H9R, 3ASL, 3QL9, 5AY8, 5JA4

Gene location (Human)
Chr.	Chromosome 1 (human)
Band	1q42.12	Start	226,061,851 bp
Band	1q42.12	End	226,073,212 bp

Gene location (Mouse)
Chr.	Chromosome 1 (mouse)
Band	1|1 H4	Start	180,628,397 bp
Band	1|1 H4	End	180,641,508 bp
RNA expression pattern
Bgee	Human / Mouse (ortholog); Top expressed in: ganglionic eminence; ventricular zone; monocyte; blood; endometrium; rectum; corpus callosum; granulocyte; appendix; gallbladder / Top expressed in: ganglionic eminence; neural tube; mesencephalon; granulocyte; ventricular zone; thymus; lip; bone marrow; ileum; epiblast; More reference expression data
BioGPS	n/a
Gene ontology
Molecular function	RNA polymerase II cis-regulatory region sequence-specific DNA binding; DNA binding; histone binding; protein binding; protein heterodimerization activity; RNA polymerase II core promoter sequence-specific DNA binding; nucleosomal DNA binding
Cellular component	nucleoplasm; chromosome; extracellular region; nuclear chromosome; extracellular exosome; Barr body; nucleosome; nucleus; protein-containing complex
Biological process	telomere organization; epigenetic maintenance of chromatin in transcription-competent conformation; blood coagulation; positive regulation of cell growth; rDNA heterochromatin assembly; negative regulation of gene expression, epigenetic; male gonad development; multicellular organism growth; single fertilization; cell population proliferation; embryo implantation; negative regulation of chromosome condensation; spermatid development; nucleus organization; osteoblast differentiation; pericentric heterochromatin assembly; oogenesis; subtelomeric heterochromatin assembly; spermatogenesis; regulation of centromere complex assembly; muscle cell differentiation; nucleosome assembly; brain development; response to hormone; regulation of gene silencing by miRNA; regulation of megakaryocyte differentiation; regulation of hematopoietic stem cell differentiation
Sources:Amigo / QuickGO
Orthologs
Databases	NCBI: entry; OMA: entry
Species	Human	Mouse
Entrez	3020	15078
Ensembl	ENSG00000163041	ENSMUSG00000060743
UniProt	P84243	P84244
RefSeq (mRNA)	NM_002107	NM_008210
RefSeq (protein)	NP_005315	NP_032236; NP_032237
Location (UCSC)	Chr 1: 226.06 – 226.07 Mb	Chr 1: 180.63 – 180.64 Mb
PubMed search
- Wikidata
View/Edit Human	View/Edit Mouse

Histone H3.3 is a protein that in humans is encoded by the H3F3A and H3F3B genes. It plays an essential role in maintaining genome integrity during mammalian development.

Histones are basic nuclear proteins that are responsible for the nucleosome structure of the chromosomal fiber in eukaryotes. Two molecules of each of the four core histones (H2A, H2B, H3, and H4) form an octamer, around which approximately 146 bp of DNA is wrapped in repeating units, called nucleosomes. The linker histone, H1, interacts with linker DNA between nucleosomes and functions in the compaction of chromatin into higher order structures. This gene contains introns and its mRNA is polyadenylated, unlike most histone genes. The protein encoded is a replication-independent member of the histone H3 family.

Mutation of H3F3A are also linked to certain cancers. p.Lys27Met were discovered in Diffuse Intrinsic Pontine Glioma (DIPG), where they are present 65-75% of tumors and confer a worse prognosis. p.Lys27Met alterations in HIST1H3B and HIST1H3C, which code for histone H3.1 have also been reported in ~10% of DIPG. H3F3A is also mutated in a smaller portion of pediatric and young adult high grade astrocytomas but more frequently as p.Gly34Arg/Val. Mutations in H3F3A and H3F3B are also found in chondroblastoma and giant cell tumor of bone.
