= HIST2H3A =

Protein-coding gene in humans

H3C15

Identifiers
- Aliases: H3C15, H3/n, H3/o, histone cluster 2, H3a, histone cluster 2 H3 family member a, HIST2H3A, H3 clustered histone 15, H3C14, H3C13
- External IDs: MGI: 2448329; GeneCards: H3C15
Available structures
PDB	Ortholog search: PDBe RCSB
PDB	List of PDB id codes 2IIJ, 2X4W, 2X4X, 2X4Y, 3AV1, 3DB3, 3MO8, 3R93, 4MZF, 4MZG, 4MZH, 4OUC, 5BO0, 2HIO, 5B0Z, 2ARO, 1EQZ, 1HQ3, 4KGC, 1TZY, 4UUZ, 2F8N, 5B0Y, 4LD9, 5B40, 5CIU

Gene location (Human)
Chr.	Chromosome 1 (human)
Band	1q21.2	Start	149,852,608 bp
Band	1q21.2	End	149,853,125 bp

Gene location (Mouse)
Chr.	Chromosome 13 (mouse)
Band	13 A3.1|13 9.78 cM	Start	23,728,222 bp
Band	13 A3.1|13 9.78 cM	End	23,729,482 bp
RNA expression pattern
Bgee	Human / Mouse (ortholog); Top expressed in: bone marrow cell; testicle; gonad; ganglionic eminence; ventricular zone; apex of heart; olfactory zone of nasal mucosa; corpus callosum; islet of Langerhans; Achilles tendon / Top expressed in: zygote; spermatocyte; embryo; primary oocyte; secondary oocyte; embryo; maxillary prominence; mandibular prominence; primitive streak; morula; More reference expression data
BioGPS	n/a
Gene ontology
Molecular function	protein heterodimerization activity; DNA binding; histone binding; protein binding; chromatin binding; nucleosomal DNA binding
Cellular component	extracellular exosome; extracellular region; nucleoplasm; chromosome; nucleosome; nucleus; chromatin
Biological process	epigenetic maintenance of chromatin in transcription-competent conformation; blood coagulation; rDNA heterochromatin assembly; nucleosome assembly; negative regulation of gene expression, epigenetic; negative regulation of transcription by RNA polymerase II; chromatin organization; regulation of gene silencing by miRNA; interleukin-7-mediated signaling pathway; regulation of megakaryocyte differentiation; regulation of hematopoietic stem cell differentiation
Sources:Amigo / QuickGO
Orthologs
Databases	NCBI: entry; OMA: entry
Species	Human	Mouse
Entrez	333932	260423
Ensembl	ENSG00000203852	ENSMUSG00000100210
UniProt	Q71DI3	P84228
RefSeq (mRNA)	NM_001005464	NM_013548
RefSeq (protein)	NP_066403; NP_001116847	NP_473386; NP_835734; NP_783584; NP_835510; NP_835587 NP_038576; NP_835511; NP_835512
Location (UCSC)	Chr 1: 149.85 – 149.85 Mb	Chr 13: 23.73 – 23.73 Mb
PubMed search
- Wikidata
View/Edit Human	View/Edit Mouse

Histone cluster 2 H3 family member a is a protein that in humans is encoded by the HIST2H3A gene.

== Function ==
Histones are basic nuclear proteins that are responsible for the nucleosome structure of the chromosomal fiber in eukaryotes. This structure consists of approximately 146 bp of DNA wrapped around a nucleosome, an octamer composed of pairs of each of the four core histones (H2A, H2B, H3, and H4). The chromatin fiber is further compacted through the interaction of a linker histone, H1, with the DNA between the nucleosomes to form higher order chromatin structures. This gene is intronless and encodes a replication-dependent histone that is a member of the histone H3 family. Transcripts from this gene lack polyA tails; instead, they contain a palindromic termination element. This gene is found in a histone cluster on human chromosome 1. This gene is one of four histone genes in the cluster that are duplicated; this record represents the centromeric copy. [provided by RefSeq, Aug 2015].
