= HIST1H3I =

Protein-coding gene in the species Homo sapiens

H3C11

Identifiers
- Aliases: H3C11, H3.f, H3/f, H3FF, histone cluster 1, H3i, histone cluster 1 H3 family member i, H3 clustered histone 11, HIST1H3I, H3C4, H3C7, H3C12, H3C2, H3C8, H3C10, H3C3, H3C6, H3C1
- External IDs: OMIM: 602814; MGI: 2448326; GeneCards: H3C11
Available structures
PDB	Ortholog search: PDBe RCSB
PDB	List of PDB id codes 3WKJ, 3B95, 2C1J, 3AYW, 3WA9, 3U4S, 5AVB, 2CV5, 5AV5, 3U31, 2UXN, 3AZK, 2C1N, 5C11, 3QO2, 3X1V, 5C13, 4A0J, 4U68, 5AV8, 4LLB, 3U5O, 1O9S, 4FT2, 4HON, 3W99, 3ZVY, 4Z0R, 5AVC, 1CT6, 1Q3L, 3O37, 3W97, 3SOW, 3KMT, 4YM6, 4A7J, 3UEE, 2KWK, 4F4U, 3UEF, 3UIG, 4BD3, 3AZL, 4QBR, 4F56, 3AFA, 4LKA, 5CPK, 5FFV, 3V43, 5CH1, 3U5P, 3AZI, 3U5N, 3AZH, 3UIK, 4QBQ, 1U35, 4UY4, 2OT7, 5AV9, 2B2W, 3U3D, 3AZF, 3W98, 4I51, 4X3K, 4FWF, 2B2T, 2B2V, 4A0N, 2KWJ, 3WAA, 3QJ6, 5DAH, 3AZG, 3AZE, 3X1T, 3RIY, 2L75, 3A1B, 2VPG, 4QBS, 3O35, 5CPJ, 3ZG6, 4YM5, 3AZJ, 2RI7, 3AZN, 3AVR, 5CPI, 2LBM, 3W96, 3O34, 2M0O, 4L7X, 5CH2, 5AV6, 3AZM, 4UP0, 3X1S, 2OX0, 3UII, 3SOU, 4N4H, 4TN7, 1CS9, 3X1U, 4LXL, 2B2U, 2OQ6, 3RIG, 5C3I, 4YHP, 5B24, 5D6Y, 4YHZ, 4Z2M, 5HJD, 5HJC, 5HJB, 5B2I, 5HYN, 5FB0, 5FB1, 5IQL, 5B2J, 5JIN

Gene location (Human)
Chr.	Chromosome 6 (human)
Band	6p22.1	Start	27,871,845 bp
Band	6p22.1	End	27,872,346 bp

Gene location (Mouse)
Chr.	Chromosome 13 (mouse)
Band	13|13 A3.1	Start	23,745,708 bp
Band	13|13 A3.1	End	23,746,543 bp
RNA expression pattern
Bgee	Human / Mouse (ortholog); Top expressed in: bone marrow cell; tendon of biceps brachii; epithelium of colon; Achilles tendon; mucosa of transverse colon; ventricular zone; tonsil; corpus callosum; ganglionic eminence; granulocyte / Top expressed in: uterus; genital tubercle; embryo; embryo; tail of embryo; yolk sac; spermatocyte; mesencephalon; bone marrow; morula; More reference expression data
BioGPS	n/a
Gene ontology
Molecular function	DNA binding; histone binding; protein binding; protein heterodimerization activity; cadherin binding; nucleosomal DNA binding
Cellular component	membrane; nucleoplasm; chromosome; extracellular region; nuclear chromosome; extracellular exosome; nucleosome; nucleus; protein-containing complex
Biological process	telomere organization; epigenetic maintenance of chromatin in transcription-competent conformation; protein heterotetramerization; blood coagulation; DNA replication-dependent chromatin assembly; rDNA heterochromatin assembly; negative regulation of gene expression, epigenetic; chromatin organization; regulation of gene silencing by miRNA; nucleosome assembly; interleukin-7-mediated signaling pathway; regulation of megakaryocyte differentiation; regulation of hematopoietic stem cell differentiation
Sources:Amigo / QuickGO
Orthologs
Databases	NCBI: entry; OMA: entry
Species	Human	Mouse
Entrez	8354	319151
Ensembl	ENSG00000275379	ENSMUSG00000069273
UniProt	P68431	P84228
RefSeq (mRNA)	NM_003533	NM_178205
RefSeq (protein)	NP_066298; NP_003520; NP_003525; NP_003527	NP_473386; NP_835734; NP_783584; NP_835510; NP_835587 NP_038576; NP_835511; NP_835512
Location (UCSC)	Chr 6: 27.87 – 27.87 Mb	Chr 13: 23.75 – 23.75 Mb
PubMed search
- Wikidata
View/Edit Human	View/Edit Mouse

Histone H3.1 is a protein that in humans is encoded by the HIST1H3I gene.

== Function ==
Histones are basic nuclear proteins that are responsible for the nucleosome structure of the chromosomal fiber in eukaryotes. Two molecules of each of the four core histones (H2A, H2B, H3, and H4) form an octamer, around which approximately 146 bp of DNA is wrapped in repeating units, called nucleosomes. The linker histone, H1, interacts with linker DNA between nucleosomes and functions in the compaction of chromatin into higher order structures. This gene is intronless and encodes a member of the histone H3 family. Transcripts from this gene lack polyA tails but instead contain a palindromic termination element. This gene is found in the small histone gene cluster on chromosome 6p22-p21.3.
