= Trey Ideker =

American professor of medicine and bioengineering

- Born: Memphis, Tennessee, US
- Education: Massachusetts Institute of Technology (MIT); University of Washington
- Awards: Overton Prize (2009)
- Scientific career
- Workplaces: UC San Diego
- Thesis: Validation and refinement of genetic networks in yeast (2001)
- Doctoral advisor: Leroy Hood
- Website: idekerlab.org

Trey Ideker is the Director of the Big Data Institute at the University of Oxford and a Professor of Medicine at the University of California, San Diego. He is also Director of the ARPA-H ADAPT Dynamic Digital Tumors for Precision Oncology Project, Director of the Bridge2AI Cell Maps for AI (CM4AI), and Co-Director of the NCI Cancer Cell Map Initiative (CCMI).

== Biography ==
Ideker received BS and MEng degrees in Computer Science from M.I.T. and a PhD in Genome Sciences from the University of Washington under the supervision of Drs. Leroy Hood and Dick Karp. Following his PhD, Ideker was then a David Baltimore Fellow at the Whitehead Institute for Biomedical Research in Cambridge, MA, from 2001 to 2003.

In 2003, Ideker joined the Jacobs School’s Department of Bioengineering at UC San Diego as an Assistant Professor of Bioengineering. In 2006, he became an Associate Professor of Bioengineering and an Adjunct Professor of Computer Science. He served as Division Chief of Medical Genetics from 2009 – 2016. Since 2010, he has been a Professor of Medicine and Adjunct Professor of Bioengineering and Computer Science, and has also served as a member of the Moores Cancer Center.

In 2026, Ideker was appointed the new Director of the University of Oxford’s Big Data Institute (BDI).

In early 2026, he was also appointed as a Visiting Member of the Ellison Medical Institute (EMI).

Ideker previously served as a member of the Board of Scientific Advisors to the NIH National Cancer Institute and National Human Genome Research Institute. He serves on the editorial boards of Cell, Cell Systems, PLoS Computational Biology, and Molecular Systems Biology. Ideker has acted as a consultant for companies including Data4Cure, Ideaya Biosciences, Serinus Biosciences, Eikon Therapeutics, Motiv Health, Plexium, and LightHorse Therapeutics.

== Honors and awards ==
In 2004, Ideker was awarded the David and Lucile Packard Foundation's Packard Fellowships for Science and Engineering.

In 2005, Ideker was named as one of the top innovators in the world under the age of 35 by the MIT Technology Review TR35. The following year, Technology Review named him one of the Top 10 Innovators of 2006.

In 2009 he was awarded the Overton Prize by the International Society for Computational Biology in recognition of his significant contribution to the field of computational biology.

Since 2019, he has been annually recognized as a Clarivate Web of Science Highly Cited Researcher (top 1% by citations).

In 2022 he was elected as a Fellow of the International Society for Computational Biology.

He is also a Fellow of the AAAS and AIMBE organizations.

== Career and research ==
Ideker has led seminal studies establishing the theory and practice of systems biology, including systematic techniques for elucidating human cell architecture and its molecular networks.

During his early career while working with Leroy Hood, Ideker was one of the first researchers to publish an integrated computational model of a metabolic network. He and Hood published a landmark paper in Science in which they built a computational model of yeast metabolism and helped define the field of systems biology.

The Ideker laboratory has produced numerous maps of protein-protein, transcriptional, and genetic networks in model organisms and humans (in collaboration with trainees and co-investigators), along with widely used Cytoscape network analysis software (with Gary Bader and others).

His studies created methodologies that are now core concepts in bioinformatics, including generation of transcriptional networks to explain genome-wide expression patterns (with Leroy Hood), network alignment and evolutionary comparison (with Richard Karp and Roded Sharan), and network biomarkers, which enable multigenic definitions of patient subtypes and treatment responses.

He also introduced experimental mapping techniques, including synthetic-lethal interaction mapping with CRISPR/Cas9 (with Prashant Mali) and characterization of differential interactions across conditions and time (with Nevan Krogan). These technologies have broadly informed the mechanisms by which diverse genetic alterations drive cancer, neurological disorders, and drug resistance.

Recently he demonstrated an end-to-end pipeline for mapping the structure of human cells over a broad scale range, based on fusion of protein networks with immunofluorescence imaging (with Emma Lundberg and Steve Gygi).

Ideker has also recently shown that network maps provide a substrate for deep learning models of cell structure and function, with basic implications for the construction of intelligent systems in precision oncology (with Jianzhu Ma and co-investigators).

Finally, Ideker and collaborators showed that large parts of the methylome are remodeled with age, leading to the first epigenetic clock and the rapidly expanding field of epigenetic aging. In 2013, Ideker, along with Kang Zhang, identified that the molecular aging clock could be measured by blood and tissues, and made use of epigenetic markers.
