= HIST1H3H =

Protein-coding gene in the species Homo sapiens

H3C10

Identifiers
- Aliases: H3C10, H3/k, H3F1K, H3FK, histone cluster 1, H3h, histone cluster 1 H3 family member h, HIST1H3H, H3 clustered histone 10, H3C4, H3C7, H3C12, H3C2, H3C8, H3C3, H3C6, H3C1, H3C11
- External IDs: OMIM: 602818; MGI: 2448319; GeneCards: H3C10
Available structures
| PDB | Ortholog search: PDBe RCSB |
| PDB | List of PDB id codes 3WKJ, 3B95, 2C1J, 3AYW, 3WA9, 3U4S, 5AVB, 2CV5, 5AV5, 3U31, 2UXN, 3AZK, 2C1N, 5C11, 3QO2, 3X1V, 5C13, 4A0J, 4U68, 5AV8, 4LLB, 3U5O, 1O9S, 4FT2, 4HON, 3W99, 3ZVY, 4Z0R, 5AVC, 1CT6, 1Q3L, 3O37, 3W97, 3SOW, 3KMT, 4YM6, 4A7J, 3UEE, 2KWK, 4F4U, 3UEF, 3UIG, 4BD3, 3AZL, 4QBR, 4F56, 3AFA, 4LKA, 5CPK, 5FFV, 3V43, 5CH1, 3U5P, 3AZI, 3U5N, 3AZH, 3UIK, 4QBQ, 1U35, 4UY4, 2OT7, 5AV9, 2B2W, 3U3D, 3AZF, 3W98, 4I51, 4X3K, 4FWF, 2B2T, 2B2V, 4A0N, 2KWJ, 3WAA, 3QJ6, 5DAH, 3AZG, 3AZE, 3X1T, 3RIY, 2L75, 3A1B, 2VPG, 4QBS, 3O35, 5CPJ, 3ZG6, 4YM5, 3AZJ, 2RI7, 3AZN, 3AVR, 5CPI, 2LBM, 3W96, 3O34, 2M0O, 4L7X, 5CH2, 5AV6, 3AZM, 4UP0, 3X1S, 2OX0, 3UII, 3SOU, 4N4H, 4TN7, 1CS9, 3X1U, 4LXL, 2B2U, 2OQ6, 3RIG, 5C3I, 4YHP, 5B24, 5D6Y, 4YHZ, 4Z2M, 5HJD, 5HJC, 5HJB, 5B2I, 5HYN, 5FB0, 5FB1, 5IQL, 5B2J, 5JIN |

Gene location (Human)
| Chr. | Chromosome 6 (human) |
| Band | 6p22.1 | Start | 27,810,051 bp |
| Band | 6p22.1 | End | 27,811,300 bp |

Gene location (Mouse)
| Chr. | Chromosome 13 (mouse) |
| Band | 13|13 A3.1 | Start | 23,936,250 bp |
| Band | 13|13 A3.1 | End | 23,936,869 bp |
RNA expression pattern
| Bgee | Human / Mouse (ortholog); Top expressed in: monocyte; bone marrow cell; mucosa of transverse colon; granulocyte; blood; amniotic fluid; epithelium of colon; gonad; rectum; spleen / Top expressed in: uterus; genital tubercle; mesencephalon; bone marrow; embryo; tail of embryo; embryo; neural tube; yolk sac; limb; More reference expression data |
| BioGPS | n/a |
Gene ontology
| Molecular function | DNA binding; histone binding; protein binding; protein heterodimerization activity; cadherin binding; nucleosomal DNA binding |
| Cellular component | membrane; nucleoplasm; chromosome; extracellular region; nuclear chromosome; extracellular exosome; nucleosome; nucleus; protein-containing complex |
| Biological process | telomere organization; epigenetic maintenance of chromatin in transcription-competent conformation; protein heterotetramerization; blood coagulation; DNA replication-dependent chromatin assembly; rDNA heterochromatin assembly; negative regulation of gene expression, epigenetic; chromatin organization; regulation of gene silencing by miRNA; nucleosome assembly; interleukin-7-mediated signaling pathway; regulation of megakaryocyte differentiation; regulation of hematopoietic stem cell differentiation |
Sources:Amigo / QuickGO
Orthologs
| Databases | NCBI: entry; OMA: entry |
| Species | Human | Mouse |
| Entrez | 8357 | 319150 |
| Ensembl | ENSG00000278828 | ENSMUSG00000069267 |
| UniProt | P68431 | P84228 |
| RefSeq (mRNA) | NM_003536 | NM_178203 |
| RefSeq (protein) | NP_066298; NP_003520; NP_003525; NP_003527 | NP_473386; NP_835734; NP_783584; NP_835510; NP_835587 NP_038576; NP_835511; NP_835512 |
| Location (UCSC) | Chr 6: 27.81 – 27.81 Mb | Chr 13: 23.94 – 23.94 Mb |
| PubMed search |
- Wikidata
| View/Edit Human | View/Edit Mouse |

Histone H3.1 is a protein that in humans is encoded by the HIST1H3H gene.

Histones are basic nuclear proteins that are responsible for the nucleosome structure of the chromosomal fiber in eukaryotes. Two molecules of each of the four core histones (H2A, H2B, H3, and H4) form an octamer, around which approximately 146 bp of DNA is wrapped in repeating units, called nucleosomes. The linker histone, H1, interacts with linker DNA between nucleosomes and functions in the compaction of chromatin into higher order structures. This gene is intronless and encodes a member of the histone H3 family. Transcripts from this gene lack polyA tails but instead contain a palindromic termination element. This gene is found in the small histone gene cluster on chromosome 6p22-p21.3.
