= Histone cluster 2 H3 family member d =

Protein found in humans

H3C13

Identifiers
- Aliases: H3C13, histone cluster 2 H3 family member d, H3 clustered histone 13, HIST2H3D, H3C15, H3C14
- External IDs: MGI: 2448320; GeneCards: H3C13
Available structures
PDB	Ortholog search: PDBe RCSB
PDB	List of PDB id codes 2IIJ, 2X4W, 2X4X, 2X4Y, 3AV1, 3DB3, 3MO8, 3R93, 4MZF, 4MZG, 4MZH, 4OUC, 5BO0, 2HIO, 5B0Z, 2ARO, 1EQZ, 1HQ3, 4KGC, 1TZY, 4UUZ, 2F8N, 5B0Y, 4LD9, 5B40, 5CIU

Gene location (Human)
Chr.	Chromosome 1 (human)
Band	1q21.2	Start	149,813,225 bp
Band	1q21.2	End	149,813,693 bp

Gene location (Mouse)
Chr.	Chromosome 13 (mouse)
Band	13|13 A3.1	Start	23,928,956 bp
Band	13|13 A3.1	End	23,929,585 bp
RNA expression pattern
Bgee	Human / Mouse (ortholog); Top expressed in: bone marrow cell; testicle; Achilles tendon; blood; right ovary; granulocyte; left ovary; fundus; corpus callosum; right adrenal cortex / Top expressed in: uterus; embryo; ventricular zone; spermatid; embryo; spermatocyte; bone marrow; mesencephalon; yolk sac; tail of embryo; More reference expression data
BioGPS	n/a
Gene ontology
Molecular function	protein heterodimerization activity; DNA binding; histone binding; protein binding; chromatin binding; nucleosomal DNA binding
Cellular component	extracellular exosome; extracellular region; nucleoplasm; chromosome; nucleosome; nucleus; chromatin
Biological process	epigenetic maintenance of chromatin in transcription-competent conformation; blood coagulation; rDNA heterochromatin assembly; nucleosome assembly; negative regulation of gene expression, epigenetic; negative regulation of transcription by RNA polymerase II; chromatin organization; regulation of gene silencing by miRNA; interleukin-7-mediated signaling pathway; regulation of megakaryocyte differentiation; regulation of hematopoietic stem cell differentiation
Sources:Amigo / QuickGO
Orthologs
Databases	NCBI: entry; OMA: entry
Species	Human	Mouse
Entrez	653604	319148
Ensembl	ENSG00000183598	ENSMUSG00000069310
UniProt	Q71DI3	P84228
RefSeq (mRNA)	NM_001123375	NM_175653
RefSeq (protein)	NP_066403; NP_001116847	NP_473386; NP_835734; NP_783584; NP_835510; NP_835587 NP_038576; NP_835511; NP_835512
Location (UCSC)	Chr 1: 149.81 – 149.81 Mb	Chr 13: 23.93 – 23.93 Mb
PubMed search
- Wikidata
View/Edit Human	View/Edit Mouse

Histone cluster 2 H3 family member d is a protein that in humans is encoded by the HIST2H3D gene.

== Function ==
Histones are basic nuclear proteins that are responsible for the nucleosome structure of the chromosomal fiber in eukaryotes. Two molecules of each of the four core histones (H2A, H2B, H3, and H4) form an octamer, around which approximately 146 bp of DNA is wrapped in repeating units, called nucleosomes. The linker histone, H1, interacts with linker DNA between nucleosomes and functions in the compaction of chromatin into higher order structures. This gene is intronless and encodes a replication-dependent histone that is a member of the histone H3 family. [provided by RefSeq, Aug 2015].
