= Kang Zhang =

Chinese-American ophthalmologist

- Born: Chengdu, Sichuan, China
- Education: M.D., Harvard University Medical School (1995); Ph.D. (Genetics), Harvard University (1991)
- Medical career
- Profession: Ophthalmologist
- Institutions: Macau University of Science and Technology
- Sub-specialties: Ophthalmic genetics Stem cell research Artificial intelligence
- Website: kangzhangmd.com

Kang Zhang (Chinese: 张康) is a Chinese-American ophthalmologist specializing in ophthalmic genetics and aging processes in the eye. He is currently a professor of the Faculty of Medicine at Macau University of Science and Technology. He was previously a professor of ophthalmology and the founding director of the Institute for Genomic Medicine at the University of California, San Diego. He subsequently moved to China and continues his research, which includes work on lanosterol. stem cell research (particularly limbal stem cells), gene editing, and artificial intelligence.

== Education ==
Born in Chengdu, Sichuan Province, China, Zhang obtained his B.S. in Biochemistry from Sichuan University in Chengdu, China in 1984. In 1991, Zhang graduated with a Ph.D. in Genetics from Harvard University. Subsequently, Zhang obtained his M.D. from a Harvard University Medical School and Massachusetts Institute of Technology Joint M.D. Program with magna cum laude honors in 1995.

== Career ==
After completing an ophthalmology residency at the Wilmer Eye Institute at Johns Hopkins University, Zhang became assistant staff at the Cole Eye Institute at the Cleveland Clinic Foundation. Zhang completed a retina fellowship at the University of Utah, and afterwards became an assistant professor at the University of Utah from 2002 to 2006.

In 2012, following an anonymous complaint, the UCSD Institutional Review Board (IRB) suspended enrollment in Zhang's research studies. After an internal review, the research was permitted to resume.

In 2013, Zhang, along with Trey Ideker, identified that the molecular aging clock could be measured by blood and tissues, and made use of epigenetic markers.

In 2014, Zhang, along with Yizhi Liu and Xiangdong Fu, investigated mechanisms and developed a new method of limbal stem cell repair and regeneration.

In 2015, Zhang discovered that lanosterol can be used in eyedrop form to help prevent cataracts.

In 2017, the FDA issued a warning letter to Zhang citing violations in his oversight of human research studies and restricted him from serving as a principal investigator on such studies. The letter referenced issues dating back to 2012. Subsequently, a UCSD internal audit identified what it described as shortcomings in Zhang's research practices.

In 2018, Zhang was senior author of a study in Cell describing a deep-learning system that classified retinal optical coherence tomography images to identify macular degeneration and diabetic macular edema.

In 2019, a clinical trial in China involving Zhang prompted a letter from international doctors questioning its ethics and methodology. Around the same time, media reports noted his undisclosed ties to a Chinese ophthalmology company. UCSD placed Zhang on administrative leave; he later resigned. Zhang's lawyer said the leave and investigation stemmed from the 2017 FDA warning, not ties to China. he wasn't charged to have committed any wrongdoing related to his research ties to China. After leaving UCSD, he joined the Faculty of Medicine at Macau University of Science and Technology. The same year he joined Macau University of Science and Technology, where he holds faculty and administrative roles including Director of the Macau Institute for AI in Medicine.

In 2021, Zhang and colleagues published a study in Nature Biomedical Engineering demonstrating that deep‑learning models could detect chronic kidney disease and type 2 diabetes from retinal fundus images, with potential applications in resource‑limited settings. In 2023, he was profiled in Cell Reports Medicine, where he described his work on multi‑modal artificial intelligence and was listed as a Clarivate Highly Cited Researcher in Cross‑Field for 2019–2022. He was appointed Vice President of Macau University of Science and Technology in 2024. In 2026, he co‑authored a paper in npj Digital Medicine describing an AI model for personalized prediction of myopia progression in children.

Zhang and colleagues proposed and implemented MetaGP, a generative medical foundation model that integrates large-scale electronic health records with multimodal medical imaging, in 2025. Zhang, together with Jia Qu, also developed MINIM, a general-purpose large-scale generative synthetic medical image model, in 2025.

In 2026, Zhang, together with Shanshan Wang, developed AFLoc, a pathology vision–language model capable of lesion localization.

== Awards ==
Some of Kang Zhang's selected awards are listed below.

- The Ophthalmologist World 100 Power List (2016, 2018)
- Fellow, American Institute for Medical and Biological Engineering (2016)
- Fellow, Association of American Physicians (2011)
- Fellow, American Association for the Advancement of Science (2011)
- America's Top Ophthalmologists, Consumer's Research Council of America (2011)
- NIH Director's Transformative R01 Program (2010)
- Senior Investigator Award, Research to Prevent Blindness (2010)
- Outstanding Achievement Award, Chinese Ophthalmological Society (2009)
- Burroughs Wellcome Fund Clinical Scientist Award in Translational Research (2008)
- Lew R. Wasserman Merit Award, Research to Prevent Blindness (2006)
- Macular Society membership (2006)
- American Society of Clinical Investigation membership (2006)
- Macular Vision Research Award (2002)
- Ruth Steinbach Fund for Macular Degeneration (2001)
- Charles Schepens Award for Excellence in Retina Research (2001)
- Johns Hopkins Medical Institutions Clinician Scientist Award (1999)

== Professional affiliations ==
Kang Zhang's professional affiliations are listed below.

- American Academy of Ophthalmology
- American Institute for Medical and Biological Engineering
- American Association for the Advancement of Science
- American Society for Clinical Investigation
- American Society of Human Genetics
- Association for Research in Vision and Ophthalmology
- Association of American Physicians
- Macular Society

== Selected publications ==
To date, Zhang has published more than 150 papers. Some selected publications are listed below.

- Yang Z, Camp NJ, Sun H, Tong Z, Gibbs D, Cameron DJ, Chen H, Zhao Y, Pearson E, Li X, Chien J, Dewan A, Harmon J, Bernstein PS, Shridhar V, Zabriskie NA, Hoh J, Howes K, Zhang K (November 2006). "A variant of the HTRA1 gene increases susceptibility to age-related macular degeneration". Science. 314 (5801): 992–3. Bibcode:2006Sci...314..992Y. doi:10.1126/science.1133811. PMID 17053109. S2CID 19577378.
- Hannum G, Guinney J, Zhao L, Zhang L, Hughes G, Sadda S, Klotzle B, Bibikova M, Fan JB, Gao Y, Deconde R, Chen M, Rajapakse I, Friend S, Ideker T, Zhang K (January 2013). "Genome-wide methylation profiles reveal quantitative views of human aging rates". Mol. Cell. 49 (2): 359–367. doi:10.1016/j.molcel.2012.10.016. PMC 3780611. PMID 23177740.
- Yu FX, Luo J, Mo JS, Liu G, Kim YC, Meng Z, Zhao L, Peyman G, Ouyang H, Jiang W, Zhao J, Chen X, Zhang L, Wang CY, Bastian BC, Zhang K, Guan KL (June 2014). "Mutant Gq/11 promote uveal melanoma tumorigenesis by activating YAP". Cancer Cell. 25 (6): 822–30. doi:10.1016/j.ccr.2014.04.017. PMC 4075337. PMID 24882516.
- Zhao L, Chen XJ, Zhu J, Xi YB, Yang X, Hu LD, Ouyang H, Patel SH, Jin X, Lin D, Wu F, Flagg K, Cai H, Li G, Cao G, Lin Y, Chen D, Wen C, Chung C, Wang Y, Qiu A, Yeh E, Wang W, Hu X, Grob S, Abagyan R, Su Z, Tjondro HC, Zhao XJ, Luo H, Hou R, Jefferson J, Perry P, Gao W, Kozak I, Granet D, Li Y, Sun X, Wang J, Zhang L, Liu Y, Yan YB, Zhang K (July 2015). "Lanosterol reverses protein aggregation in cataracts". Nature. 523 (7562): 607–11. Bibcode:2015Natur.523..607Z. doi:10.1038/nature14650. PMID 26200341. S2CID 4469138.
- Hu CM, Fang RH, Wang KC, Luk BT, Thamphiwatana S, Dehaini D, Nguyen P, Angsantikul P, Wen CH, Kroll AV, Carpenter C, Ramesh M, Qu V, Patel SH, Zhu J, Shi W, Hofman FM, Chen TC, Gao W, Zhang K, Chien S, Zhang L (October 2015). "Nanoparticle biointerfacing by platelet membrane cloaking". Nature. 526 (7571): 118–21. Bibcode:2015Natur.526..118H. doi:10.1038/nature15373. PMC 4871317. PMID 26374997.
- Liu Y, Wu F, Lu L, Lin D, Zhang K (August 2015). "Videos in Clinical Medicine: Examination of the Retina". N. Engl. J. Med. 373 (8): e9. doi:10.1056/NEJMvcm1308125. PMID 26287871.
- Lin H, Ouyang H, Zhu J, Huang S, Liu Z, Chen S, Cao G, Li G, Signer RA, Xu Y, Chung C, Zhang Y, Lin D, Patel S, Wu F, Cai H, Hou J, Wen C, Jafari M, Liu X, Luo L, Zhu J, Qiu A, Hou R, Chen B, Chen J, Granet D, Heichel C, Shang F, Li X, Krawczyk M, Skowronska-Krawczyk D, Wang Y, Shi W, Chen D, Zhong Z, Zhong S, Zhang L, Chen S, Morrison SJ, Maas RL, Zhang K, Liu Y (March 2016). "Lens regeneration using endogenous stem cells with gain of visual function". Nature. 531 (7594): 323–8. Bibcode:2016Natur.531..323L. doi:10.1038/nature17181. PMC 6061995. PMID 26958831.
- Suzuki K, Tsunekawa Y, Hernandez-Benitez R, Wu J, Zhu J, Kim EJ, Hatanaka F, Yamamoto M, Araoka T, Li Z, Kurita M, Hishida T, Li M, Aizawa E, Guo S, Chen S, Goebl A, Soligalla RD, Qu J, Jiang T, Fu X, Jafari M, Esteban CR, Berggren WT, Lajara J, Nuñez-Delicado E, Guillen P, Campistol JM, Matsuzaki F, Liu GH, Magistretti P, Zhang K, Callaway EM, Zhang K, Belmonte JC (December 2016). "In vivo genome editing via CRISPR/Cas9 mediated homology-independent targeted integration". Nature. 540 (7631): 144–149. Bibcode:2016Natur.540..144S. doi:10.1038/nature20565. PMC 5331785. PMID 27851729.
- Hao X, Luo H, Krawczyk M, Wei W, Wang W, Wang J, Flagg K, Hou J, Zhang H, Yi S, Jafari M, Lin D, Chung C, Caughey BA, Li G, Dhar D, Shi W, Zheng L, Hou R, Zhu J, Zhao L, Fu X, Zhang E, Zhang C, Zhu JK, Karin M, Xu RH, Zhang K (July 2017). "DNA methylation markers for diagnosis and prognosis of common cancers". Proc. Natl. Acad. Sci. U.S.A. 114 (28): 7414–7419. Bibcode:2017PNAS..114.7414H. doi:10.1073/pnas.1703577114. PMC 5514741. PMID 28652331.
- Xu RH, Wei W, Krawczyk M, Wang W, Luo H, Flagg K, Yi S, Shi W, Quan Q, Li K, Zheng L, Zhang H, Caughey BA, Zhao Q, Hou J, Zhang R, Xu Y, Cai H, Li G, Hou R, Zhong Z, Lin D, Fu X, Zhu J, Duan Y, Yu M, Ying B, Zhang W, Wang J, Zhang E, Zhang C, Li O, Guo R, Carter H, Zhu JK, Hao X, Zhang K (November 2017). "Circulating tumour DNA methylation markers for diagnosis and prognosis of hepatocellular carcinoma". Nat Mater. 16 (11): 1155–1161. Bibcode:2017NatMa..16.1155X. doi:10.1038/nmat4997. PMID 29035356.
- Zhu J, Ming C, Fu X, Duan Y, Hoang DA, Rutgard J, Zhang R, Wang W, Hou R, Zhang D, Zhang E, Zhang C, Hao X, Xiong W, Zhang K (June 2017). "Gene and mutation independent therapy via CRISPR-Cas9 mediated cellular reprogramming in rod photoreceptors". Cell Res. 27 (6): 830–833. doi:10.1038/cr.2017.57. PMC 5518875. PMID 28429769.
- Kermany DS, Goldbaum M, Cai W, Valentim C, Liang H, Baxter SL, McKeown A, Yang G, Wu X, Yan F, Dong J, Prasadha MK, Pei J, Ting M, Zhu J, Li C, Hewett S, Dong J, Ziyar I, Shi A, Zhang R, Zheng L, Hou R, Shi W, Fu X, Duan Y, Huu V, Wen C, Zhang ED, Zhang CL, Li O, Wang X, Singer MA, Sun X, Xu J, Tafreshi A, Lewis MA, Xia H, Zhang K (February 2018). "Identifying Medical Diagnoses and Treatable Diseases by Image-Based Deep Learning". Cell. 172 (5): 1122–1131.e9. doi:10.1016/j.cell.2018.02.010. PMID 29474911.
- Liang H, Tsui BY, Ni H, Valentim C, Baxter SL, Liu G, Cai W, Kermany DS, Sun X, Chen J, He L, Zhu J, Tian P, Shao H, Zheng L, Hou R, Hewett S, Li G, Liang P, Zang X, Zhang Z, Pan L, Cai H, Ling R, Li S, Cui Y, Tang S, Ye H, Huang X, He W, Liang W, Zhang Q, Jiang J, Yu W, Gao J, Ou W, Deng Y, Hou Q, Wang B, Yao C, Liang Y, Zhang S, Duan Y, Zhang R, Gibson S, Zhang CL, Li O, Zhang ED, Karin G, Nguyen N, Wu X, Wen C, Xu J, Xu W, Wang B, Wang W, Li J, Pizzato B, Bao C, Xiang D, He W, He S, Zhou Y, Haw W, Goldbaum M, Tremoulet A, Hsu CN, Carter H, Zhu L, Zhang K, Xia H (March 2019). "Evaluation and accurate diagnoses of pediatric diseases using artificial intelligence". Nat. Med. 25 (3): 433–438. doi:10.1038/s41591-018-0335-9. PMID 30742121. S2CID 59945159.
- Lu Y, Zhang K (March 2018). "Cellular Reprogramming in the Retina - Seeing the Light". N. Engl. J. Med. 378 (11): 1059–1060. doi:10.1056/NEJMcibr1713887. PMID 29539280. S2CID 3931861.
- Xia H, Li X, Gao W, Fu X, Fang FR, Zhang L, Zhang K (2018). "Tissue repair and regeneration with endogenous stem cells". Nature Reviews Materials. 3 (7): 174–193. Bibcode:2018NatRM...3..174X. doi:10.1038/s41578-018-0027-6.
