= HIST1H3C =

Protein-coding gene in the species Homo sapiens

H3C3

Identifiers
- Aliases: H3C3, H3.1, H3/c, H3FC, histone cluster 1, H3c, histone cluster 1 H3 family member c, HIST1H3C
- External IDs: OMIM: 602812; MGI: 2448355; GeneCards: H3C3
Available structures
PDB	Ortholog search: PDBe RCSB
PDB	List of PDB id codes 3WKJ, 3B95, 2C1J, 3AYW, 3WA9, 3U4S, 5AVB, 2CV5, 5AV5, 3U31, 2UXN, 3AZK, 2C1N, 5C11, 3QO2, 3X1V, 5C13, 4A0J, 4U68, 5AV8, 4LLB, 3U5O, 1O9S, 4FT2, 4HON, 3W99, 3ZVY, 4Z0R, 5AVC, 1CT6, 1Q3L, 3O37, 3W97, 3SOW, 3KMT, 4YM6, 4A7J, 3UEE, 2KWK, 4F4U, 3UEF, 3UIG, 4BD3, 3AZL, 4QBR, 4F56, 3AFA, 4LKA, 5CPK, 5FFV, 3V43, 5CH1, 3U5P, 3AZI, 3U5N, 3AZH, 3UIK, 4QBQ, 1U35, 4UY4, 2OT7, 5AV9, 2B2W, 3U3D, 3AZF, 3W98, 4I51, 4X3K, 4FWF, 2B2T, 2B2V, 4A0N, 2KWJ, 3WAA, 3QJ6, 5DAH, 3AZG, 3AZE, 3X1T, 3RIY, 2L75, 3A1B, 2VPG, 4QBS, 3O35, 5CPJ, 3ZG6, 4YM5, 3AZJ, 2RI7, 3AZN, 3AVR, 5CPI, 2LBM, 3W96, 3O34, 2M0O, 4L7X, 5CH2, 5AV6, 3AZM, 4UP0, 3X1S, 2OX0, 3UII, 3SOU, 4N4H, 4TN7, 1CS9, 3X1U, 4LXL, 2B2U, 2OQ6, 3RIG, 5C3I, 4YHP, 5B24, 5D6Y, 4YHZ, 4Z2M, 5HJD, 5HJC, 5HJB, 5B2I, 5HYN, 5FB0, 5FB1, 5IQL, 5B2J, 5JIN

Gene location (Human)
Chr.	Chromosome 6 (human)
Band	6p22.2	Start	26,045,411 bp
Band	6p22.2	End	26,045,821 bp

Gene location (Mouse)
Chr.	Chromosome 3 (mouse)
Band	3|3 F2.1	Start	96,154,001 bp
Band	3|3 F2.1	End	96,155,825 bp
RNA expression pattern
Bgee	Human / Mouse (ortholog); Top expressed in: stomach; colon; lung; kidney; heart; vagina; ovary; testicle / Top expressed in: genital tubercle; secondary oocyte; primary oocyte; embryo; zygote; embryo; morula; tail of embryo; bone marrow; epiblast; More reference expression data
BioGPS	n/a
Gene ontology
Molecular function	DNA binding; histone binding; protein binding; protein heterodimerization activity; cadherin binding; nucleosomal DNA binding
Cellular component	membrane; nucleoplasm; chromosome; extracellular region; nuclear chromosome; extracellular exosome; nucleosome; nucleus; protein-containing complex
Biological process	telomere organization; epigenetic maintenance of chromatin in transcription-competent conformation; protein heterotetramerization; blood coagulation; DNA replication-dependent chromatin assembly; rDNA heterochromatin assembly; negative regulation of gene expression, epigenetic; chromatin organization; regulation of gene silencing by miRNA; nucleosome assembly; interleukin-7-mediated signaling pathway; regulation of megakaryocyte differentiation; regulation of hematopoietic stem cell differentiation
Sources:Amigo / QuickGO
Orthologs
Databases	NCBI: entry; OMA: entry
Species	Human	Mouse
Entrez	8352	15077
Ensembl	ENSG00000278272	ENSMUSG00000093769
UniProt	P68431	P84228
RefSeq (mRNA)	NM_003531	NM_178216
RefSeq (protein)	NP_066298; NP_003520; NP_003525; NP_003527	NP_473386; NP_835734; NP_783584; NP_835510; NP_835587 NP_038576; NP_835511; NP_835512
Location (UCSC)	Chr 6: 26.05 – 26.05 Mb	Chr 3: 96.15 – 96.16 Mb
PubMed search
- Wikidata
View/Edit Human	View/Edit Mouse

Histone H3.1 is a protein that in humans is encoded by the HIST1H3C gene.

Histones are basic nuclear proteins that are responsible for the nucleosome structure of the chromosomal fiber in eukaryotes. Two molecules of each of the four core histones (H2A, H2B, H3, and H4) form an octamer, around which approximately 146 bp of DNA is wrapped in repeating units, called nucleosomes. The linker histone, H1, interacts with linker DNA between nucleosomes, and functions in the compaction of chromatin into higher order structures.

This gene is intronless, and encodes a member of the histone H3 family. Transcripts from this gene lack polyA tails, instead containing a palindromic termination element. This gene is found in the large histone gene cluster on chromosome 6.
