= H3F3B =

Protein-coding gene in the species Homo sapiens

H3-3B
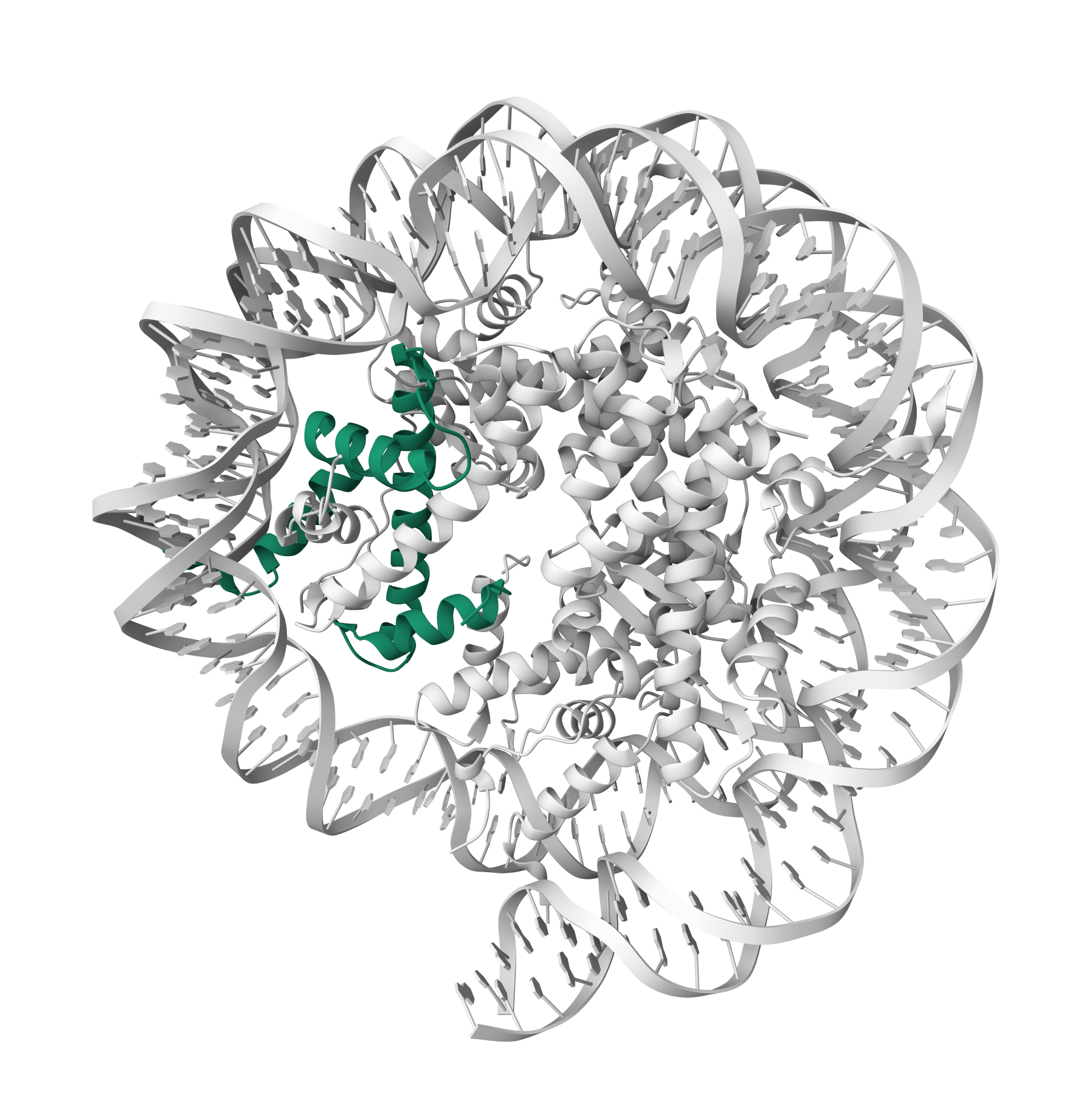

Identifiers
- Aliases: H3-3B, H3.3B, H3 histone, family 3B (H3.3B), H3 histone family member 3B, H3.3 histone B, H3F3B, H3-3A, BRYLIB2
- External IDs: OMIM: 601058; MGI: 1097686; GeneCards: H3-3B
Available structures
PDB	Ortholog search: PDBe RCSB
PDB	List of PDB id codes 4H9O, 5BNX, 3JVK, 5DWQ, 4L58, 4TMP, 5DX0, 4H9S, 4W5A, 3AV2, 3WTP, 4HGA, 4GUS, 4GY5, 3MUK, 3QLC, 4H9Q, 4N4I, 4GU0, 4GNE, 5BNV, 2L43, 3MUL, 4H9P, 3QLA, 4QQ4, 4GNF, 4U7T, 3ASK, 4O62, 4GNG, 4GUR, 4H9N, 4H9R, 3ASL, 3QL9, 5AY8, 5JA4

Gene location (Human)
Chr.	Chromosome 17 (human)
Band	17q25.1	Start	75,776,434 bp
Band	17q25.1	End	75,785,893 bp

Gene location (Mouse)
Chr.	Chromosome 1 (mouse)
Band	1|1 H4	Start	180,628,397 bp
Band	1|1 H4	End	180,641,508 bp
RNA expression pattern
Bgee	Human / Mouse (ortholog); Top expressed in: oocyte; secondary oocyte; trigeminal ganglion; lactiferous duct; caput epididymis; lower lobe of lung; tail of epididymis; left testis; male germ cell; right testis / Top expressed in: ganglionic eminence; neural tube; mesencephalon; granulocyte; ventricular zone; thymus; lip; bone marrow; ileum; epiblast; More reference expression data
BioGPS	n/a
Gene ontology
Molecular function	RNA polymerase II cis-regulatory region sequence-specific DNA binding; DNA binding; histone binding; protein binding; protein heterodimerization activity; RNA polymerase II core promoter sequence-specific DNA binding; nucleosomal DNA binding
Cellular component	nucleoplasm; chromosome; extracellular region; nuclear chromosome; extracellular exosome; Barr body; nucleosome; nucleus; protein-containing complex
Biological process	telomere organization; epigenetic maintenance of chromatin in transcription-competent conformation; blood coagulation; positive regulation of cell growth; rDNA heterochromatin assembly; negative regulation of gene expression, epigenetic; male gonad development; multicellular organism growth; single fertilization; cell population proliferation; embryo implantation; negative regulation of chromosome condensation; spermatid development; nucleus organization; osteoblast differentiation; pericentric heterochromatin assembly; oogenesis; subtelomeric heterochromatin assembly; spermatogenesis; regulation of centromere complex assembly; muscle cell differentiation; nucleosome assembly; brain development; response to hormone; regulation of gene silencing by miRNA; regulation of megakaryocyte differentiation; regulation of hematopoietic stem cell differentiation
Sources:Amigo / QuickGO
Orthologs
Databases	NCBI: entry; OMA: entry
Species	Human	Mouse
Entrez	3021	15078
Ensembl	ENSG00000132475	ENSMUSG00000060743
UniProt	P84243	P84244
RefSeq (mRNA)	NM_005324	NM_008210
RefSeq (protein)	NP_005315	NP_032236; NP_032237
Location (UCSC)	Chr 17: 75.78 – 75.79 Mb	Chr 1: 180.63 – 180.64 Mb
PubMed search
- Wikidata
View/Edit Human	View/Edit Mouse

Histone H3.3 is a protein that in humans is encoded by the H3-3A, and the H3-3B genes.

== Function ==
Histones are basic nuclear proteins that are responsible for the nucleosome structure of the chromosomal fiber in eukaryotes. Two molecules of each of the four core histones (H2A, H2B, H3, and H4) form an octamer, around which approximately 146 bp of DNA is wrapped in repeating units, called nucleosomes. The linker histone, H1, interacts with linker DNA between nucleosomes and functions in the compaction of chromatin into higher order structures.

== Gene ==
This gene contains introns and its mRNA is polyadenylated, unlike most histone genes. The protein encoded is a member of the histone H3 family. Unlike most histone genes, H3F3B is not located in a cluster, but rather is isolated in the telomeric region of chromosome 17.

== Clinical significance ==
Somatic mutations mostly in the H3F3B gene are associated with chondroblastoma, but some are associated with mutations in H3F3A. A rare de novo germline mutation of the H3F3B gene (A30P) has been linked to a syndrome with a range of developmental and behavioral abnormalities including microcephaly, mild strabismus, seizure disorder, autistic continuum, hypothyroidism, global developmental delay, and low muscle tone.
