= Transgenerational =

Transgenerational may refer to:

- Heredity
- Transgenerational epigenetic inheritance
- Epigenome
- Epigenetics (section Transgenerational)
- Allele

- Lamarckism (section Transgenerational epigenetic inheritance)
- Addiction (section Transgenerational epigenetic inheritance)
- Addiction vulnerability (section Transgenerational epigenetic inheritance)

- Effects of nuclear explosions on human health (section Transgenerational genetic damage)

- Transgenerational trauma
- Transgenerational stress inheritance
- Childhood trauma (section Transgenerational effects)
- Behavioural responses to stress (section Transgenerational responses)

- Generation
- Generation gap

- Design
- Product design
- Architecture
- Transgenerational design
