= Relationships and health =

Theories on the benefits of social relationships on one's health

There is empirical evidence of the causal impact of social relationships on health. The social support theory suggests that relationships might promote health especially by promoting adaptive behavior or regulating the stress response. Troubled relationships as well as loneliness and social exclusion may have negative consequences on health. Neurosciences of health investigate the neuronal circuits implicated in the context of both social connection and disconnection.

== Models ==
Poor relationships have a negative impact on health outcomes. In 1985, Cohen and Wills presented two models that have been employed to describe this connection: the main effect model and the stress-buffering model.

The main effect model postulates that our social networks influence our psychology (our affect) and our physiology (biological responses). These three variables are thought to influence health, as described in Figure 1. This model predicts that increasing social networks may enhance general health. A possible mechanism by which social networks improve our health is through our behaviors: if our social network influences us to behave in a certain way that enhances our health, then it can be argued that our social network influences our health. For example, it has been demonstrated that higher social support improves our level of physical activity, which in turn has a positive effect on our health. It is unclear if this effect of social support is a threshold or a gradient. The difference between the two of them is that a threshold effect is a necessary amount of social support required to have a positive effect on health, on the opposite, a gradient effect can be described as a linear effect of the amount of social support on health, meaning that an increase of x amount of social support will result in an increase of y level of health.

The second model proposed by Cohen and Wills (1985) is the stress-buffering model. This model explains the effect of social networks on health when an individual is facing a stressful event. It predicts that, when facing a stressful event, an individual with a high perceived social support network will have better strategies, or resources, to face this event, hence resulting in better physical and mental health. Stress is an adaptive response when facing stressful events. A stressful event can be a life-threatening event (e.g., a disease, encountering a dangerous wild-animal) or a social-life event (e.g., a deadline, loss of a job, a conflict with a friend). This stress generates physiological or behavioral responses, depending on the event. However, this stress is not always "negative stress", it can also be "positive stress": Hans Selye distinguishes them as distress and eustress, respectively. As described in Figure 2, social support, more precisely perceived social support, has an impact on the appraisal processes and on the physiological and behavioral responses, according to the stress-buffering model. The appraisal processes refer to the way we evaluate an event as stressful or not (perceived stress or benign appraisal, respectively). The physiological and behavioral responses refer to what we call coping strategies. Those strategies are meant to help an individual to deal with a stressful event, but they can prove to be successful or not. Among different studies, this model has been used to understand how social support can be protective against infectious disease and also the link between social support and health outcomes in the specific case of homeless individuals, and both these studies demonstrate that social support has a positive impact on health outcomes, even if these two contexts seem highly different.

It has been argued that the main effect of social support is based on structural aspects of social relationships, like the social network size, and that the stress-buffering effect of social support is based on functional aspects of social relationships, like the quality of social support. This assumption has been quite well supported by the literature, but it remains unclear if other mechanisms of social relationships can have an impact on health too. Some studies have observed that there exist differences in this effect between males and females. In the specific domain of depression, it has been shown that some differences in the type of social support used to face depression are different between male and female participants, and this difference results in different coping strategies between gender. Indeed, men seem to need a social network that supports them for self-control, while women seem to need a social network that helps them recognize their problems. Thus, it seems important that the theoretical models include some other factors, such as gender, to explain the links between social networks and health outcomes. Despite this kind of criticism, both models have been supported by many studies.

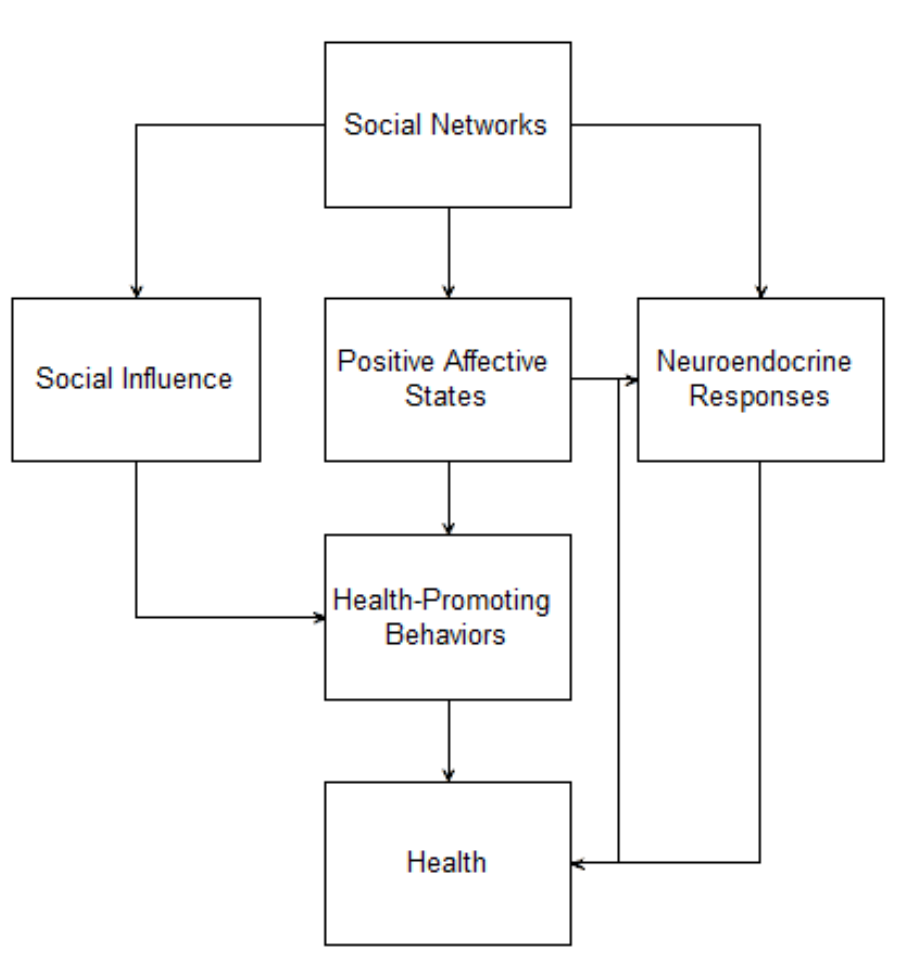
Main effect model of social ties and health. Adapted from Kawachi and Berkman (2001).

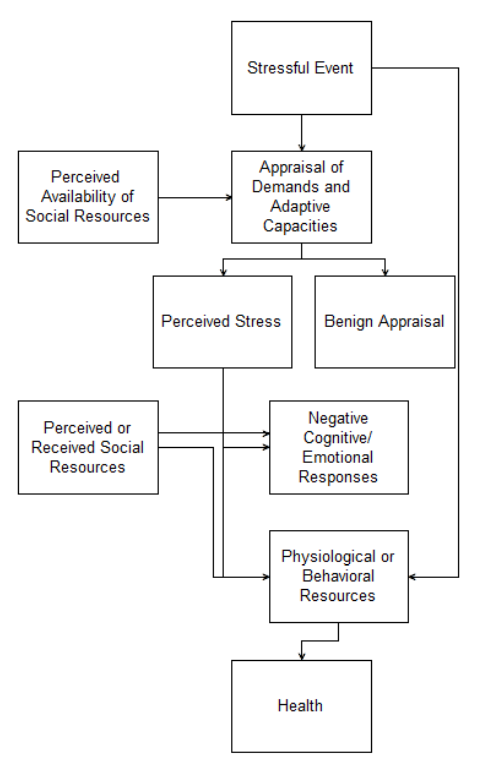
Figure 2: Stress-buffering model of social ties and health. Adapted from Kawachi and Berkman (2001).

== Relationship quality and health ==
There is evidence that social integration is negatively linked to suicide and marital status is negatively linked to mortality rates from all-causes. Hibbard (1985) explored the link between social ties and health status by conducting a series of household surveys. Indeed, she found that people who have more social ties, more perception of control, and are most trustful with others tend to have better physical health. Thoits investigated how social ties can improve both mental and physical health. The results showed that social ties might influence emotional sustenance and promote active coping assistance. The other significant point of this research is that we can define two types of "supporters" able to provide different types of social support. Significant others (i.e., family, friends, spouse, etc.) tend to provide more instrumental support and emotional sustaining whereas experientially similar others (i.e., people who experienced the same life events than us) tend to provide more empathy, "role model" (a similar person looked like a model, a person to imitate) and active coping assistance.

Furthermore, social support can help us to regulate emotions above all when we are facing a stressful event. Probably one of the most famous studies on this field of investigation was conducted by Coan, Schaefer, and Davidson. In their study, they told married couples to go together in the laboratory. All couples reported a high level of marital satisfaction. The study aimed to evaluate the effect of hand-holding on the neural response to a threat. To create a stressful event, they informed the woman participant of each couple that she will receive moderate electric shocks. There were three experimental conditions: no hand holding, stranger hand holding, or spouse hand-holding. The findings suggested that both spouse and stranger hand holding attenuated neural response to the threat, but spousal hand-holding was particularly efficient. Moreover, even within this sample of married couples with high satisfaction levels, the benefits of spousal hand holding under threat were even more important in those couples who have reported the highest quality of marital relationship.

As it was mentioned before, social contact can help regulate emotional responses to cope with life stressors. People who benefit from high social support tend to perceive the stressful situation as less threatening. Consequently, they produce a less intense behavioral response to deal with the stressors. People who have more social support must engage less cognitive effort to regulate emotions than people who do not experience this kind of social support. Relationships provide social support that allows us to engage fewer resources to regulate our emotions, especially when we must cope with stressful situations.

Social relationships have short-term and long-term effects on health, both mental and physical. In a lifespan perspective, recent research suggests that early life experiences still have consequences on health behavior in adulthood. Indeed, either positive or negative effects of relationships tend to foster cumulative advantage or disadvantage in health. Low-quality relationships, as well as the lack of social support, have negative consequences on health, moreover, these consequences can be cumulative in a lifespan perspective.

In some studies, marriage was found as one of the most important relationships for many adults and may have beneficial effects on health, depending on the perception of the marital relationship. Low-quality marital relationships can have negative effects on physical health. Thus, unfortunate marriages might be more associated with morbidity and mortality. Moreover, some physiological responses such as elevations in heart rate, changes in hormone levels related to stress, and alterations to immunity function, emerge during conflict discussions in married couples. Low-quality marital relationships increase the probability of developing chronic stress and tend to have long-term implications for health.

However, the lack of relationships, that is social isolation, loneliness, or social exclusion, have also negative consequences on both mental and physical health. First, it is important to distinguish between two similar expressions that are social isolation and loneliness. Social isolation refers to the objective lack of relationships, whereas loneliness is a more subjective feeling of isolation and distress. A study was conducted in the United States among older adults to examine the relationship between social isolation, loneliness, and health outcomes. The results gave evidence that the feeling of loneliness is not always correlated with social isolation. Indeed, the feeling of loneliness is more strongly related to having mental health problems than objective social isolation.

Younger people are also affected by social isolation. Hefner and Eisenberg conducted a study among college students to evaluate the relationship between social support and mental health. The study reveals two interesting results. First, students with greater risk of social isolation are those who have characteristics that differ from most of their classmates (i.e., minority race or ethnicity, international status, low socio-economic status, etc.). Second, students who report lower quality of social support tend to experience more mental health problems (i.e., depression symptoms) than those who report a higher quality of social support.

== Proposed neuroscientific explanations for the link between relationships and health ==
The development of some research methods such as neuroimaging, hormone studies, and clinical neuropsychology has opened and expanded both the study and the understanding of the link between health and social relationships. Even animal studies have also helped the progress of this new field which is called "neuroscience of health". From a neuroscientific perspective, it could be considered that social experiences involve specific neural systems. Some research has managed to differentiate two brain response systems based on the type of social experience. In this sense, social experiences considered negative would activate brain structures destined to the threat process, and the social experiences perceived as positive or pleasant would involve structures corresponding to the reward system.

Each system, whether it is the threat response system or the reward system, would trigger a series of certain psychophysiological responses that are linked to health such as adaptive behaviors, heart rate, hormone production, blood pressure, respiratory rate, etc. Similarly, it has been argued that the involvement of the reward system would have an inhibitory effect on the alarm system. Some empirical evidence supporting these ideas has been obtained based on research in animals, in humans through neuroimaging, and hormonal studies.

Concerning the threat response system, it has been observed that the dorsal anterior cingulate cortex (dACC), the anterior insula, and the periaqueductal gray play an important role. When these areas have been impaired in animals, they show a reduction of distress. In the same vein, when humans are presented with photos of deceased loved ones, these same structures show a significant activation.

On the other hand, for the reward system linked to the social experience, the ventromedial prefrontal cortex (VMPFC) seems to have an important implication. In a study conducted by Eisenberger and colleagues in 2011, the participants saw a picture of a highly supportive, romantic relationship partner during an experience of physical pain. The results showed increased activation of the VMPFC and at the same time, a decrease of the dACC. Similarly, the supportive messages during social exclusion show the same activity in the VMPFC.

Finally, regarding hormonal studies, Uchino and colleagues suggest that there is a link between the hypothalamic-pituitary-adrenal axis and inflammatory markers that may predict some health problems such as cardiovascular disease, diabetes, and frailty. Furthermore, during social stimuli such as touch or massage, some production of oxytocin has been observed. This hormone has anti-stress effects which are associated with a decrease in cortisol levels and blood pleasure. Thus, although the neuroscientific approach is still in development, there is some neurological evidence of the link between social relationships and health.

== Applications ==
Based on what has been described above, it is important to elaborate interventions that improve physical and mental health by enhancing social relationships. These interventions could target different contexts (work, friendship, etc.) or different populations (young or aged people, married or single, etc.). Identifying the context and the population targeted is important because some individuals are more at risk than others overall or in some specific contexts. For instance, it is well described that students are a population categorized at risk of health problems, and among students, black students are more concerned by mental health problems. In this example, it is important to design an intervention that is specific for black students, which is slightly different from the one designed for students in general.

According to Kawachi and Berkman, some interventions have been proposed, with some success, to improve social ties: support group interventions, one-to-one support interventions, and interventions to enhance natural networks. Due to the variability of each intervention, even in the same category of intervention, that has been proposed in the literature, it is not feasible to draw generalized conclusions. However, by targeting specific contexts and specific populations, some studies found that these kinds of interventions can be effective to improve physical or mental health. For instance, Leung, Orrell, and Orgeta (2015) reviewed the literature testing the positive effect of social support group interventions for people diagnosed with dementia and found out they have small benefits on depression and the quality of life of the patients. However, the trials included in this review are too limited (only two studies that fit the inclusion criteria), they are heterogeneous, meaning that it is difficult to conclude on the effect of social support group interventions on this context, and more randomized controlled trials will be needed.

Four interventions have been identified by Masi and collaborators to reduce loneliness: improving social skills, enhancing social support, increasing opportunities for social interaction, and addressing abnormal social cognition. Increasing opportunities for social interaction and enhancing social skills could have a bigger impact on social isolation, whereas improving social skills and addressing abnormal social cognition focus on loneliness. Improving social skills refers to giving methods to better interact with others. Among lonely college students, this kind of intervention was positively associated with less loneliness. The goal of the interventions that address abnormal social cognition is that lonely individuals learn that automatic negative thoughts are not facts, but hypotheses. For seniors, interventions could be home-visit or telephone contacts, group interventions/activities, etc. The most effective ones might be group interventions. One intervention that aims to increase opportunities for social interaction is befriending, which seems to reduce social isolation. The interventions that seem to be the most effective one is interventions that enhance opportunities for social interaction via group activities or group-based interventions. Men tend to be more receptive to those interventions than women, potentially because women tend to be more self-reliant than men. The interventions that enhance social support seem to be the least effective, and interventions that address abnormal social cognition seem to have the biggest impact on loneliness compared to the other interventions.

Another aspect that is important to mention is the social policies. Because the effect of the relationship on health is also preventive, the implementation of social ties policies may be effective to enhance health and well-being in the population. Some health outcomes (obesity, happiness, etc.) may be widely "expanded" through social networks. Social policies should use this natural effect on the interventions. One major issue that policies must face is that the relation between social ties and health vary across social groups, so they need to be careful about how to and whose implement the interventions. To reduce social isolation, policies can enhance the education system to improve social-emotional skills for instance.

To improve both interventions and health policies, future research is still needed to identify the populations that are at high risk of social isolation and to understand what types of interventions or prevention campaigns can be effective on this public health issue.

== Criticism of models ==
The sample size of related studies has generally been low, which impacts statistical robustness of findings.

Another criticism is a lack of representativeness of the samples. Most of the studies were conducted in western societies. As Adams and Glenn point out, personal relationships can have various effects among different countries. Thus, it is possible that studying in most of the populations of western countries will highlight different results than studying low-income countries. This assumption is reinforced by the findings of De Silva and colleagues that suggest the effect of relationships on health might differ depending on the culture. Hence, it will be important to explore this effect with larger samples that fit better with the populations of the countries and to explore this link between different cultures.

When reviewing the link between social support and depression symptoms, Gariépy et al. found out that the measurement of social support was problematic in the literature. Indeed, the tools used to measure social support were heterogeneous between the studies reviewed. The consequence of this heterogeneity is that it cannot be sure that all the studies measure the same thing. Furthermore, they stated that more than half of the studies reviewed used measurement tools that were not statistically valid, meaning that it is unsure whether these tools truly measure social support. Based on their research, it can be easily guessed that this problem is also found in other research that studies the link between social relationships and health. Digging this issue, Dambi and colleagues compared the translation of one of the most used scales to assess perceived social support, the Multidimensional Perceived Social Support Scale (MSPSS), and found out that they were not equally valid. One of the major issues they described is that the different translated scales were not rigorously translated. Hence, it cannot be possible to compare different studies from different countries that used the MSPSS to evaluate the effect of relationships on health, and it can be assumed that this problem can also be found in other international scales. Given all the critics presented, this field of psychology needs to explore the links between relationships and health by using reliable methods: bigger sample size, representative samples, causality design, and valid measurement tools. The utilization of these reliable methods will be useful to generalize the findings to a broader population and to enhance the statistical power of the studies (what can be summarized as the quality of the studies). It is reassuring to observe the development of new ways of doing science, like crowdsourced science that encourages the use of better methods to enhance the quality of scientific research.
