= Epigenome =

Biological term

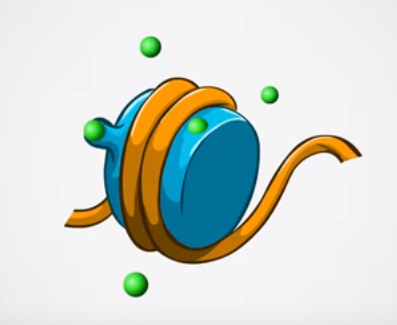
The function of DNA strands (yellow) alters depending on how it is organized around histones (blue) that can be methylated (green).

In biology, the epigenome of an organism is the collection of chemical changes to its DNA and histone proteins that affects when, where, and how the DNA is expressed; these changes can be passed down to an organism's offspring via transgenerational epigenetic inheritance. Changes to the epigenome can result in changes to the structure of chromatin and changes to the function of the genome. The human epigenome, including DNA methylation and histone modification, is maintained through cell division (both mitosis and meiosis). The epigenome is essential for normal development and cellular differentiation, enabling cells with the same genetic code to perform different functions. The human epigenome is dynamic and can be influenced by environmental factors such as diet, stress, and toxins.

The epigenome is involved in regulating gene expression, development, tissue differentiation, and suppression of transposable elements. Unlike the underlying genome, which remains largely static within an individual, the epigenome can be dynamically altered by environmental conditions.

== Types ==
The main types of epigenetic changes include:

=== DNA methylation ===
Addition of a methyl group to the DNA molecule, typically at cytosine bases. This modification generally leads to gene silencing by preventing the binding of transcription factors and other proteins necessary for gene expression.

DNA functionally interacts with a variety of epigenetic marks, such as cytosine methylation, also known as 5-methylcytosine (5mC). This epigenetic mark is widely conserved and plays major roles in the regulation of gene expression, in the silencing of transposable elements and repeat sequences.

Individuals differ with their epigenetic profile, for example the variance in CpG methylation among individuals is about 42%. On the contrary, epigenetic profile (including methylation profile) of each individual is constant over the course of a year, reflecting the constancy of our phenotype and metabolic traits. Methylation profile, in particular, is quite stable in a 12-month period and appears to change more over decades.

==== Methylation sites ====
CoRSIVs are Correlated Regions of Systemic Interindividual Variation in DNA methylation. They span only 0.1% of the human genome, so they are very rare; they can be inter-correlated over long genomic distances (>50 kbp). CoRSIVs are also associated with genes involved in a lot of human disorders, including tumors, mental disorders and cardiovascular diseases. It has been observed that disease-associated CpG sites are 37% enriched in CoRSIVs compared to control regions and 53% enriched in CoRSIVs relative to tDMRs (tissue specific Differentially Methylated Regions).

Most of the CoRSIVs are only 200 – 300 bp long and include 5–10 CpG dinucleotides, the largest span several kbp and involve hundreds of CpGs. These regions tend to occur in clusters and the two genomic areas of high CoRSIV density are observed at the major histocompatibility (MHC) locus on chromosome 6 and at the pericentromeric region on the long arm of chromosome 20.

CoRSIVs are enriched in intergenic and quiescent regions (e.g. subtelomeric regions) and contain many transposable elements, but few CpG islands (CGI) and transcription factor binding sites. CoRSIVs are under-represented in the proximity of genes, in heterochromatic regions, active promoters, and enhancers. They are also usually not present in highly conserved genomic regions.

CoRSIVs can have a useful application: measurements of CoRSIV methylation in one tissue can provide some information about epigenetic regulation in other tissues, indeed we can predict the expression of associated genes because systemic epigenetic variants are generally consistent in all tissues and cell types.

==== Factors affecting methylation pattern ====
Quantification of the heritable basis underlying population epigenomic variation is also important to delineate its cis- and trans-regulatory architecture. In particular, most studies state that inter-individual differences in DNA methylation are mainly determined by cis-regulatory sequence polymorphisms, probably involving mutations in TFBSs (Transcription Factor Binding Sites) with downstream consequences on local chromatin environment. The sparsity of trans-acting polymorphisms in humans suggests that such effects are highly deleterious. Indeed, trans-acting factors are expected to be caused by mutations in chromatin control genes or other highly pleiotropic regulators. If trans-acting variants do exist in human populations, they probably segregate as rare alleles or originate from somatic mutations and present with clinical phenotypes, as is the case in many cancers.

==== Correlation between methylation and gene expression ====
DNA methylation (in particular in CpG regions) is able to affect gene expression: hypermethylated regions tend to be differentially expressed. In fact, people with a similar methylation profile tend to also have the same transcriptome. Moreover, one key observation from human methylation is that most functionally relevant changes in CpG methylation occur in regulatory elements, such as enhancers.

Anyway, differential expression concerns only a slight number of methylated genes: only one fifth of genes with CpG methylation shows variable expression according to their methylation state. It is important to notice that methylation is not the only factor affecting gene regulation.

==== Methylation in embryos ====
It was revealed by immunostaining experiments that in human preimplantation embryos there is a global DNA demethylation process. After fertilisation, the DNA methylation level decreases sharply in the early pronuclei. This is a consequence of active DNA demethylation at this stage. But global demethylation is not an irreversible process; in fact, de novo methylation occurs from the early to mid-pronuclear stage and from the 4-cell to the 8-cell stage.

The percentage of DNA methylation is different in oocytes and in sperm: the mature oocyte has an intermediate level of DNA methylation (72%), instead the sperm has high level of DNA methylation (86%). Demethylation in paternal genome occurs quickly after fertilisation, whereas the maternal genome is quite resistant at the demethylation process at this stage. Maternal different methylated regions (DMRs) are more resistant to the preimplantation demethylation wave.

CpG methylation is similar in germinal vesicle (GV) stage, intermediate metaphase I (MI) stage and mature metaphase II (MII) stage. Non-CpG methylation continues to accumulate in these stages.

Chromatin accessibility in germline was evaluated by different approaches, like scATAC-seq and sciATAC-seq, scCOOL-seq, scNOMe-seq and scDNase-seq. Stage-specific proximal and distal regions with accessible chromatin regions were identified. Global chromatin accessibility is found to gradually decrease from the zygote to the 8-cell stage and then increase. Parental allele-specific analysis shows that paternal genome becomes more open than the maternal genome from the late zygote stage to the 4-cell stage, which may reflect decondensation of the paternal genome with replacement of protamines by histones.

==== Sequence-Dependent Allele-Specific Methylation ====
DNA methylation imbalances between homologous chromosomes show sequence-dependent behavior. Difference in the methylation state of neighboring cytosines on the same chromosome occurs due to the difference in DNA sequence between the chromosomes. Whole-genome bisulfite sequencing (WGBS) is used to explore sequence-dependent allele-specific methylation (SD-ASM) at a single-chromosome resolution level and comprehensive whole-genome coverage. The results of WGBS tested on 49 methylomes revealed CpG methylation imbalances exceeding 30% differences in 5% of the loci.

On the sites of gene regulatory loci bound by transcription factors the random switching between methylated and unmethylated states of DNA was observed. This is also referred as stochastic switching and it is linked to selective buffering of gene regulatory circuit against mutations and genetic diseases. Only rare genetic variants show the stochastic type of gene regulation.

The study made by Onuchic et al. was aimed to construct the maps of allelic imbalances in DNA methylation, gene transcription, and also of histone modifications. 36 cell and tissue types from 13 participant donors were used to examine 71 epigenomes. The results of WGBS tested on 49 methylomes revealed CpG methylation imbalances exceeding 30% differences in 5% of the loci. The stochastic switching occurred at thousands of heterozygous regulatory loci that were bound to transcription factors. The intermediate methylation state is referred to the relative frequencies between methylated and unmethylated epialleles. The epiallele frequency variations are correlated with the allele affinity for transcription factors.

The analysis of the study suggests that human epigenome in average covers approximately 200 adverse SD-ASM variants. The sensitivity of the genes with tissue-specific expression patterns gives the opportunity for the evolutionary innovation in gene regulation.

Haplotype reconstruction strategy is used to trace chromatin chemical modifications (using ChIP-seq) in a variety of human tissues. Haplotype-resolved epigenomic maps can trace allelic biases in chromatin configuration. A substantial variation among different tissues and individuals is observed. This allows the deeper understanding of cis-regulatory relationships between genes and control sequences.

=== Histone modification ===
Post-translational modifications of histone proteins, which include methylation, acetylation, phosphorylation, ubiquitination, and sumoylation. These modifications can either activate or repress gene expression by altering chromatin structure and accessibility of the DNA to transcriptional machinery.

The epigenetic profiles of human tissues reveals the following distinct histone modifications in different functional areas:

Active Promoters	Active Enhancers	Transcribed Gene Bodies	Silenced Regions
H3K4me3	H3K4me1	H3K36me3	H3K27me3
H3K27ac	H3K27ac		H3K9me3

==== Acetylation ====
Histone acetylation neutralizes the positive charge on histones. This weakens the electrostatic attraction to negatively charged DNA and causes unwinding of DNA from histones, making the DNA more accessible to the transcriptional machinery and hence resulting in transcriptional activation.

==== Methylation ====
Can lead to activation or repression of gene expression depending on the specific amino acids that are methylated.

=== Non-coding RNA gene silencing ===
Non-coding RNA (ncRNA) gene silencing involves various types of non-coding RNAs, such as microRNAs (miRNAs), long non-coding RNAs (lncRNAs), and small interfering RNAs (siRNAs). These RNA molecules can modulate gene expression by various mechanisms, including mRNA degradation, inhibition of translation, and chromatin remodeling.

== Structural modifications ==
During the last few years, several methods have been developed to study the structural and consequently the functional modifications of chromatin. The first project that used epigenomic profiling to identify regulatory elements in the human genome was ENCODE (Encyclopedia of DNA Elements) that focused on profiling histone modifications on cell lines. A few years later ENCODE was included in the International Human Epigenome Consortium (IHEC), which aims to coordinate international epigenome studies.

The structural modifications that these projects aim to study can be divided into five main groups:

- Nucleosome occupancy to detect regions with regulatory genes;
- Chromatin interactions and domains;

=== Topological associated domains (TADs) ===
Topological associated domains are a degree of structural organization of the genome of the cell. They are formed by regions of chromatin, sized from 100 kilobases up to megabases, which highly self-interact. The domains are linked by other genomic regions, which, based on their size, are either called “topological boundary regions” or “unorganized chromatin”. These boundary regions separate the topological domains from heterochromatin, and prevent the amplification of the latter. Topological domains are diffused in mammalian, although similar genome partitions were identified also in Drosophila.

Topological domains in humans, like in other mammalians, have many functions regarding gene expression and transcriptional control process. Inside these domains, the chromatin shows to be well tangled, while in the boundary regions chromatin interactions are far less present. These boundary areas in particular show some peculiarity that determine the functions of all the topological domains.

Firstly, they contain insulator regions and barrier elements, both of which function as inhibitors of further transcription from the RNA polymerase enzyme. Such elements are characterized by the massive presence of insulator binding proteins CTCF.

Secondly, boundary regions block heterochromatin spreading, thus preventing the loss of useful genetic informations. This information derives from the observation that the heterochromatin mark H3K9me3 sequences clearly interrupts near boundary sequences.

Thirdly, transcription start sites (TSS), housekeeping genes and tRNA genes are particularly abundant in boundary regions, denoting that those areas have a prolific transcriptional activity, thanks to their structural characteristics, different from other topological regions.

Finally, in the border areas of the topological domains and their surroundings there is an enrichment of Alu/B1 and B2 SINE retrotransposons. In the recent years, those sequences were referred to alter binding site of CTCF, thus interfering with expression of some genomic areas.

Further proofs towards a role in genetic modulation and transcription regulation refers to the great conservation of the boundary pattern across mammalian evolution, with a dynamic range of small diversities inside different cell types, suggesting that these topological domains take part in cell-type specific regulatory events.

=== Correlation between methylation and 3D structure ===
The 4D Nucleome project aims to realize a 3D maps of mammalian genomes in order to develop predictive models to correlate epigenomic modifications with genetic variation. In particular the goal is to link genetic and epigenomic modifications with the enhancers and promoters which they interact with in three-dimensional space, thus discovering gene-set interactomes and pathways as new candidates for functional analysis and therapeutic targeting.

Hi-C is an experimental method used to map the connections between DNA fragments in three-dimensional space on a genome-wide scale. This technique combines chemical crosslinking of chromatin with restriction enzyme digestion and next-generation DNA sequencing.

This kind of studies are currently limited by the lack or unavailability of raw data.

== Clinical significance ==
=== Cancer ===
Epigenetics is a currently active topic in cancer research. Human tumors undergo a major disruption of DNA methylation and histone modification patterns. The aberrant epigenetic landscape of the cancer cell is characterized by a global genomic hypomethylation, CpG island promoter hypermethylation of tumor suppressor genes, an altered histone code for critical genes and a global loss of monoacetylated and trimethylated histone H4.

=== Aging ===
The idea that DNA damage drives aging by compromising transcription and DNA replication has been widely supported since it was initially developed the 1980s. In recent decades, evidence has accumulated supporting the additional idea that DNA damage and repair elicit widespread epigenome alterations that also contribute to aging (e.g.). Such epigenome changes include age-related changes in the patterns of DNA methylation and histone modification.

== Research ==
As a prelude to a potential Human Epigenome Project, the Human Epigenome Pilot Project aims to identify and catalogue Methylation Variable Positions (MVPs) in the human genome. Advances in sequencing technology now allow for assaying genome-wide epigenomic states by multiple molecular methodologies. Micro- and nanoscale devices have been constructed or proposed to investigate the epigenome.

An international effort to assay reference epigenomes commenced in 2010 in the form of the International Human Epigenome Consortium (IHEC). IHEC members aim to generate at least 1,000 reference (baseline) human epigenomes from different types of normal and disease-related human cell types.

=== Roadmap epigenomics project ===
One goal of the NIH Roadmap Epigenomics Project is to generate human reference epigenomes from normal, healthy individuals across a large variety of cell lines, primary cells, and primary tissues. Data produced by the project, which can be browsed and downloaded from the Human Epigenome Atlas, fall into five types that assay different aspects of the epigenome and outcomes of epigenomic states (such as gene expression):

1. Histone Modifications – Chromatin Immunoprecipitation Sequencing (ChIP-Seq) identifies genome wide patterns of histone modifications using antibodies against the modifications.
2. DNA Methylation – Whole Genome Bisulfite-Seq, Reduced Representation Bisulfite-Seq (RRBS), Methylated DNA Immunoprecipitation Sequencing (MeDIP-Seq), and Methylation-sensitive Restriction Enzyme Sequencing (MRE-Seq) identify DNA methylation across portions of the genome at varying levels of resolution down to basepair level.
3. Chromatin Accessibility – DNase I hypersensitive sites Sequencing (DNase-Seq) uses the DNase I enzyme to find open or accessible regions in the genome.
4. Gene Expression – RNA-Seq and expression arrays identify expression levels or protein coding genes.
5. Small RNA Expression – smRNA-Seq identifies expression of small noncoding RNA, primarily miRNAs.

Reference epigenomes for healthy individuals will enable the second goal of the Roadmap Epigenomics Project, which is to examine epigenomic differences that occur in disease states such as Alzheimer's disease.

== See also ==
- Epigenetics
- Epigenome editing
- Epigenome-wide association study
- Human epigenome
- NCBI Epigenomics
