= OPHN1 =

Protein-coding gene in the species Homo sapiens

Identifiers
- Aliases: OPHN1, ARHGAP41, MRX60, OPN1, oligophrenin 1, MRXSBL
- External IDs: OMIM: 300127; MGI: 2151070; GeneCards: OPHN1

Gene location (Human)
Chr.	X chromosome (human)
Band	Xq12	Start	67,949,349 bp
Band	Xq12	End	68,433,913 bp

Gene location (Mouse)
Chr.	X chromosome (mouse)
Band	X|X C3	Start	97,597,883 bp
Band	X|X C3	End	97,934,631 bp
RNA expression pattern
Bgee	Human / Mouse (ortholog); Top expressed in: corpus callosum; Achilles tendon; sural nerve; ventricular zone; ganglionic eminence; amygdala; nucleus accumbens; caudate nucleus; putamen; cingulate gyrus / Top expressed in: zygote; trigeminal ganglion; primary oocyte; motor neuron; secondary oocyte; substantia nigra; sciatic nerve; Rostral migratory stream; internal carotid artery; external carotid artery; More reference expression data
BioGPS	n/a
Gene ontology
Molecular function	GTPase activator activity; actin binding; ionotropic glutamate receptor binding; phospholipid binding
Cellular component	cytoplasm; cytosol; cell projection; dendritic spine; synapse; axon; cell junction; terminal bouton; dendrite; actin cytoskeleton; glutamatergic synapse
Biological process	regulation of endocytosis; endocytosis; substrate-dependent cell migration, cell extension; nervous system development; axon guidance; positive regulation of GTPase activity; synaptic vesicle endocytosis; negative regulation of proteasomal protein catabolic process; regulation of synaptic transmission, glutamatergic; regulation of small GTPase mediated signal transduction; actin cytoskeleton organization; signal transduction; cell junction assembly; establishment of epithelial cell apical/basal polarity; cerebellar granule cell differentiation; cerebral cortex neuron differentiation; neuron differentiation; neuron projection development; regulation of Rho protein signal transduction; cell morphogenesis involved in neuron differentiation; maintenance of postsynaptic specialization structure; regulation of postsynaptic neurotransmitter receptor internalization
Sources:Amigo / QuickGO
Orthologs
Databases	NCBI: entry; OMA: entry
Species	Human	Mouse
Entrez	4983	94190
Ensembl	ENSG00000079482	ENSMUSG00000031214
UniProt	O60890	Q99J31
RefSeq (mRNA)	NM_002547	NM_052976; NM_001313754; NM_001313755; NM_001313756
RefSeq (protein)	NP_002538	NP_001300683; NP_001300684; NP_001300685; NP_443208
Location (UCSC)	Chr X: 67.95 – 68.43 Mb	Chr X: 97.6 – 97.93 Mb
PubMed search
- Wikidata
View/Edit Human	View/Edit Mouse

Oligophrenin-1 is a protein that in humans is encoded by the OPHN1 gene.

== Function ==
Oligophrenin 1 has 25 exons and encodes a Rho-GTPase-activating protein. The Rho proteins are important mediators of intracellular signal transduction, which affects cell migration and cell morphogenesis.

The role of OPHN1 in the medial prefrontal cortex in the behavioural responses to stress, and learned helplessness-inducing effect of OPHN1 deletion in parvalbumin interneurons, is of recent research interest. It is also involved in regulation in inhibitory interneurons in the olfactory bulb.

== Clinical significance ==
Mutations in this gene are responsible for non-specific X-linked intellectual disability (previously called mental retardation).

OPHN1 syndrome is a rare disorder characterized by intellectual disability and changes in the part of the brain which controls movement and balance (cerebellum). The syndrome mainly affects males. It is characterized by low muscle tone (hypotonia), developmental and cognitive delay, early-onset seizures, abnormal behavior, characteristic facial features (long face, bulging forehead, under eye creases, deep set eyes, and large ears), crossed eyes (strabismus) and inability to coordinate movements. A small cerebellum and large ventricles can be seen on brain imaging (MRI). Treatment is supportive and includes physical, occupational and speech and language therapy. In 2014 an OPHN1 patient organization and website was formed to support families and promote OPHN1 syndrome research.

OPHN1 syndrome is caused by mutations in the OPHN1 gene, which is located on the X chromosome. Inheritance is X-linked. Some females who carry a mutation in the OPHN1 gene may have mild learning disabilities, mild cognitive impairment, strabismus, and subtle facial changes.
