= NCBI Epigenomics =

Content
- Description: epigenomic data sets.

Contact
- Research center: National Center for Biotechnology Information
- Authors: Ian M Fingerman
- Primary citation: Fingerman & al. (2011)
- Release date: 2010

Access
- Website: https://www.ncbi.nlm.nih.gov/epigenomics

The Epigenomics database at the National Center for Biotechnology Information was a database for whole-genome epigenetics data sets. It was retired on 1 June 2016.

== History ==
The Epigenomics database of the National Center for Biotechnology Information (NCBI) at the National Institutes of Health (NIH) was launched in June 2010 as a means to collect maps of epigenetic modifications and their occurrence across the human genome. This database provides a publicly available resource for maps in stem cells and primary ex vivo tissues that detail genome-wide landscapes of epigenetic factors that occur in human development and disease.

== Content ==
The primary resources for the content of the Epigenomics Database are derived from two archival databases at the NCBI: The Gene Expression Omnibus (GEO) and the Sequence Read Archive (SRA). The Gene Expression Omnibus is a data system for high-throughput genomic data that is generated from microarray and next-generation sequencing technologies. Data used in the Epigenomics database is a combination of GEO and SRA subsets that are specific to Epigenetic factors. This data is subjected to additional review and organized in a more easily attainable fashion before added to the Epigenomics database.

== Database use ==
All of the experiments and corresponding samples in the Epigenomics database are displayed in the default browser. As of October 2013, there are currently 4112 experiments and 1257 samples available in the database. Five studied species are represented in the database, and many data tracks are available including expression of micro and small RNAs, histone modification and histone modifying enzymes, chromatin accessibility and chromatin associated factors, and transcription factors. One such example from the database is a study of certain epigenetic factors in Drosophila melanogaster at the 20- to 24-hour embryonic stage of development.

The Epigenomics database browser contain two fundamental search records, "Experiments" and "Samples".

=== Experiment search ===
The Experiment search record refers to one or more experiments with a set of scientific aims. Here a user is able to retrieve full data source information. This information includes the institution of the submitter, links to the original data submissions in GEO and SRA, links to literature citations in PubMed and/or full text articles in Pubmed. Experiment records contain a unique accession number that includes a prefix 'ESS'.

=== Sample search ===
The sample search record corresponds to the biological material examined in a given experiment in the database and provides details about source attributes with values from controlled vocabularies. There are over 20 biological attribute fields available, and among these fields include strain, cultivar, ecotype, individual, gender, age, developmental stage, cell line, cell type, tissue type, and health status.

=== Database navigation and usage help resources ===
There are many available resources online for help in navigating and using the Epigenomics database. The "Epigenetics Help" section of the NCBI help manual contains information on the searchable database and provides a user with tools to use, manage, download and upload, and navigate the database. There are also guides to navigation of the database aimed at specific researchers and fields of study, such as stem cell research.

== Roadmap Epigenomics Project ==
In 2007 the National Institutes of Health (NIH) launched the Roadmap Epigenomics Project. The aim of the project is a development of publicly available reference epigenome maps from a variety of cell types. These epigenetic maps are intended to provide resources for studies of epigenetic events that underline human development, diversity, and disease. For similar efforts see the ENCODE (ENCyclopedia Of DNA Elements) Project, whose initiatives are complementary to the Roadmap Epigenomics Project.

== The epigenome ==
The epigenome consists of a record of the chemical changes to the DNA and Histone proteins of an organism. These chemical changes influence gene expression across many tissue types and developmental stages. These epigenetic changes involve methods of altering gene expression that do not involve changes in the underlying primary DNA sequence; these include DNA methylation, Gene silencing, and chromatin structure, as well as involvement of Non-coding RNA.

== See also ==
- Epigenomics
