= IHEC =

IHEC may refer to:

- Independent High Electoral Commission
- International Human Epigenome Consortium
