= Psychosocial genomics =

Field of research

Psychosocial genomics (PG) is a field of research first proposed by Ernest L. Rossi in 2002. PG examines the modulation of gene expression in response to psychological, social and cultural experiences. Independent research shows that the experience of novelty, environmental enrichment and exercise facilitates activity and experience dependent gene expression and brain plasticity as well as stem cell healing processes.

This is a top-down approach – from mind to body – that modulates the role of gene expression and brain plasticity in the development of human consciousness which can be perceived as the completion, or dynamic complement, of the bottom-up approach – direct sensorial and biological responses – as proposed by the ENCODE consortium.

PG utilizes various methods and approaches derived from genomics, neuroscience and culturomics. These include DNA microarrays, and computational analysis with the GSEA database.
