= Gheorghe Maria =

Romanian chemical engineer

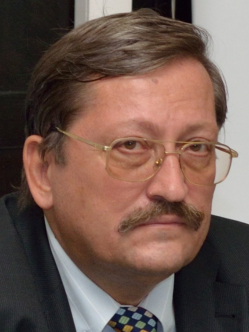
- Education: University of Bucharest
- Scientific career
- Fields: Chemistry
- Workplaces: Politehnica University of Bucharest

Gheorghe Maria is a Romanian chemical engineer, member of Department of Chemical and Biochemical Engineering at Politehnica University of Bucharest and corresponding member of the Romanian Academy.

== Biography ==
Gheorghe Maria's research interests include a wide range of classic but also modern border fields, namely (bio)chemical reactors (design, risk analysis, optimization), modelling chemical kinetics, but also dynamics of cell metabolic processes, of gene regulatory circuits, and of controlled drug release. Following the international cooperations, its scientific productivity includes over 230 papers in ISI journals and international conferences, 13 ISBN books published in Romania and the US, 5 teaching books (published at University POLITEHNICA of Bucharest), and 9 ISBN book chapters. Their practical realizations include the design and putting into operation of an industrial plant in Romania (at Petrochemical works Refinery Brazi-Ploiesti, PWBP,1985), of a lab-scale pilot plant in Switzerland (Paul Scherer Inst., 1992–1998), and a safety-based optimization of a semi-batch (SBR) reactor at CIBA-Novartis, Basel (1994–1996). Based on their multiple contributions, it can be stated that Maria has had a significant impact on the science and the practice of Chemical and Biochemical Reaction Engineering in Romania and worldwide, his publications being well cited (Hirsch index 22, I10 index 55, about 1700 citations). Corresponding member of the Romanian Academy (RA). Head of the Chemical and Biochemical Engineering Commission of the RA.
