= Gregory D. Zimet =

- Known for: HPV vaccine acceptance research Multidimensional Scale of Perceived Social Support (MSPSS)

Academic background
- Education: Vassar College (BA, 1978); Duke University (MA, 1981; PhD, 1985)

Academic work
- Discipline: Clinical psychology
- Sub-discipline: Vaccination attitudes and behavior
- Institutions: Indiana University School of Medicine; Case Western Reserve University

Gregory D. Zimet is an American clinical psychologist and academic researcher known for his work on vaccination attitudes and behavior, particularly regarding human papillomavirus vaccination (HPV), and for co-developing the Multidimensional Scale of Perceived Social Support (MSPSS). He is professor emeritus of Pediatrics and Psychiatry at Indiana University School of Medicine, where he served on the faculty for three decades.

== Early life and education ==
Zimet earned his Bachelor of Arts degree in psychology from Vassar College in 1978. He went on to receive both his Master of Arts (1981) and Doctor of Philosophy (1985) in clinical psychology from Duke University. He completed a predoctoral internship and postdoctoral training at Case Western Reserve University School of Medicine from 1984 to 1986.

== Career ==
After his postdoctoral training, Zimet joined Case Western Reserve University as an Assistant Professor of Psychiatry (1986–1987), then as Assistant Professor of Pediatrics, a position he held from 1987 to 1993.

In 1993, Zimet joined the faculty at Indiana University School of Medicine in the Department of Pediatrics, Division of Adolescent Medicine. He was promoted to full Professor of Pediatrics in 1999 and also held appointments in the Department of Psychiatry, the Department of Psychology at Indiana University Indianapolis, and the Indiana University School of Nursing. From 2006 until his retirement Zimet was a faculty member in the Cancer Prevention and Control Program of the Indiana University Simon Comprehensive Cancer Center. He served as co-founder and co-director of the Indiana University School of Medicine Center for HPV Research (2012–2023).

Following his retirement from Indiana University in July 2023, Zimet was appointed professor emeritus of Pediatrics at the Indiana University School of Medicine and has continued to collaborate on research related to vaccination and vaccine hesitancy.

== Research ==
Zimet's primary research program has focused on the behavioural and social science aspects of vaccination, with particular emphasis on attitudes toward and determinants of HPV vaccination. Beginning in the mid-1990s, his group was among the earliest to investigate adolescent and parental attitudes toward vaccines for sexually transmitted infections, work that predated the availability of HPV vaccines.

His research has encompassed randomized clinical trials evaluating the effects of behavioral interventions on hepatitis B virus (HBV) and HPV vaccine uptake, as well as acceptance of HIV testing among adolescents and young adults. His federally funded investigations have also examined microbicide acceptability and herpes testing acceptance. Through nearly 15 years of involvement with the Adolescent Medicine Trials Network (ATN) for HIV/AIDS Interventions, Zimet investigated consent and ethical factors related to the recruitment of adolescents into biomedical HIV prevention clinical trials.

More recently, Zimet has contributed to research on COVID-19 vaccination attitudes and prevention strategies.

Zimet has authored or co-authored approximately 420 publications, including over 240 peer-reviewed research articles, review papers, and editorials specifically on vaccination topics in his career.

=== Multidimensional Scale of Perceived Social Support (MSPSS) ===
In the 1980s, while at Duke University, Zimet co-developed the Multidimensional Scale of Perceived Social Support (MSPSS) along with several colleagues, including his mother, Sara Zimet. The MSPSS is a 12-item self-report instrument that measures perceived social support from three sources: family, friends, and a significant other.

The MSPSS has become one of the most widely used instruments in social support research globally. It has been translated into more than 35 languages including Arabic, Chinese, French, Korean, Russian, Spanish, and Urdu and has been validated across diverse populations in Africa, the Americas, Asia, and Europe.

== Selected publications ==
- Zimet, GD; Dahlem, NW; Zimet, SG; Farley, GK (1988). "The Multidimensional Scale of Perceived Social Support". Journal of Personality Assessment. 52 (1): 30–41. doi:10.1207/s15327752jpa5201_2.
- Zimet, GD; Mays, RM; Sturm, LA; Ravert, AA; Perkins, SM; Juliar, BE (2005). "Parental attitudes about sexually transmitted infection vaccination for their adolescent children". Archives of Pediatrics & Adolescent Medicine. 159 (2): 132–137. doi:10.1001/archpedi.159.2.132. PMID 15699306.
- Fu, LY; Bonhomme, LA; Cooper, SC; Joseph, JG; Zimet, GD (2014). "Educational interventions to increase HPV vaccination acceptance: a systematic review". Vaccine. 32 (17): 1901–1920. doi:10.1016/j.vaccine.2014.01.091. PMC 4285433. PMID 24530401.
- Sturm, L; Donahue, K; Kasting, M; Kulkarni, A; Brewer, NT; Zimet, GD (2017). "Pediatrician-Parent Conversations About Human Papillomavirus Vaccination: An Analysis of Audio Recordings". Journal of Adolescent Health. 61 (2): 246–251. doi:10.1016/j.jadohealth.2017.02.006. PMID 28455129.
- Head, KJ; Kasting, ML; Sturm, LA; Hartsock, JA; Zimet, GD (2020). "A National Survey Assessing SARS-CoV-2 Vaccination Intentions". Science Communication. 42 (5): 698–723. doi:10.1177/1075547020960463. PMC 7520657. PMID 38602991.
- Zimet, GD; Lim, E; Matsunaga, M; Liebermann, E; Kornides, M; Fontenot, HB (2025). "Early Adolescent Immunization Schedule Preferences". Journal of Adolescent Health. 77 (2S): S14–S17. doi:10.1016/j.jadohealth.2025.05.003. PMID 40716907.
