= Multidimensional Scale of Perceived Social Support =

Psychological measurement instrument

The Multidimensional Scale of Perceived Social Support (MSPSS) is a widely used psychological measurement instrument to assess an individual's perceived social support from three sources: family, friends, and a significant other. The instrument consists of 12 self-report items, grouped into three corresponding subscales. Responses are recorded using a Likert-type scale, and scores may be calculated for each subscale as well as for an overall measure of perceived social support.

The scale was developed during the early to mid-1980s by Gregory D. Zimet, Nancy W. Dahlem, Sara G. Zimet, and Gordon K. Farley, and was first published in 1988 in the Journal of Personality Assessment. It was designed as a brief measure of perceived social support for use in research settings. It has been applied in numerous peer‑reviewed studies, across many populations and cultural contexts, to assess perceived social support in both clinical and non‑clinical settings.

== Background and development ==
Research on social support in psychology has distinguished between received support and perceived social support, with the latter referring to an individual’s subjective evaluation of the availability and adequacy of supportive relationships. During the 1970s and 1980s, a number of instruments were developed to measure social support; however, many existing measures were either lengthy or did not differentiate between sources of support.

The Multidimensional Scale of Perceived Social Support was developed in the early to mid-1980s by the scale's authors. They aimed to create a brief self-report measure that distinguished between different sources of perceived social support rather than treating social support as a unitary construct. The scale was conceptualized as comprising three domains - family, friends, and a significant other - reflecting categories commonly identified in the social support literature.

The initial description of the instrument, including its development and preliminary evaluation, was published in Journal of Personality Assessment. The measure was intended for use in research settings and was designed to be applicable to both adolescent and adult populations. Following its publication, the scale was examined by independent researchers in a range of samples, contributing to subsequent analyses of its structure and measurement characteristics. The scale is available for use in research settings without charge and does not require formal permission, provided that the original publication is appropriately cited.

== Description of the scale ==
The Multidimensional Scale of Perceived Social Support consists of 12 self-report items designed to assess an individual's perception of social support. The items are grouped into three four-item subscales, each representing a different source of perceived support: family, friends, and a significant other.

Each item is rated using a Likert-type response scale. The scale was originally developed with a seven-point response format ranging from strong disagreement to strong agreement, although some later studies have employed a five-point scale. Scores for each subscale are typically calculated by averaging the responses to the corresponding items, and an overall perceived social support score may be derived by averaging all 12 items. Higher scores indicate greater perceived social support. The wording of the items focuses on the perceived availability and adequacy of emotional and instrumental support rather than on the frequency of received support. The scale does not assess the size of an individual's social network or the objective provision of support.

The MSPSS is intended for use with adolescents and adults and has been administered in both paper-based and electronic formats in research settings. Variations in response scale labeling and scoring procedures have appeared in the literature, particularly in translated and adapted versions of the instrument.

== Criticism and limitations ==
The Multidimensional Scale of Perceived Social Support is a self-report instrument, and responses can be influenced by individual differences in perception or response style. The scale assesses subjective evaluations of social support rather than objective characteristics of social relationships or the amount of support received.

The use of the MSPSS in different cultural contexts has been examined in the literature. Although translated versions are widely used, some studies have noted that cultural differences in the interpretation of social relationships may influence responses to certain items. As a result, the comparability of scores across cultures may depend on the specific adaptation and population studied. However, a recent study contrasted a community-engaged translation of the MSPSS in Diné bizaad (Navajo) with a standard forward translation (also in Navajo) using a randomized study and did not find clear support for one version over the other (in terms of validity/fit indices or reliability).

The scale focuses on perceived availability of support and does not include measures of social network structure or specific types of support. In some research contexts, it is therefore used alongside other instruments when a more detailed assessment of social relationships is required.
