= International Human Epigenome Consortium =

The International Human Epigenome Consortium (IHEC) is a scientific organization, founded in 2010, that helps to coordinate global efforts in the field of Epigenomics. The initial goal was to generate at least 1,000 reference (baseline) human epigenomes from different types of normal and disease-related human cell types.

== Structure and funding ==
IHEC's operations are funded by its full members (national and regional scientific funding agencies), and staffed largely on a volunteer basis by scientists and other experts from participating funding agencies and epigenome mapping projects.

=== Current IHEC Member Countries ===
- Canadian Institutes for Health Research (Canada)
- European Commission (EU)
- Federal Ministry of Education and Research, Project Management Agency within the German Aerospace Centre (Germany)
- Genome Institute of Singapore (Singapore)
- Hong Kong Epigenomics Project (Hong Kong)
- Japan Agency for Medical Research and Development (Japan)
- National Institute of Health (South Korea)
- National Institutes of Health: Roadmap Epigenomics Program and Encyclopedia of DNA Elements (ENCODE) project (USA)

In addition, countries and agencies supportive of IHEC goals are organizations that have not yet made a full financial contribution to the project, but whose members provide time and expertise:

- European Institute of Oncology, FIRC Institute of Molecular Oncology Foundation, Italian Institute of Technology, Centre for Genomic Science (Italy)
- National Agency of Research (France)
- National Health and Medical Research Council (Australia)
- UK Funders Alliance: Medical Research Council, Biotechnology and Biological Sciences Research Council, Cancer Research UK, and Wellcome Trust (UK)

Oversight of IHEC is provided by an executive committee, whose members are nominated by Full Member organizations. This committee works closely with an International Scientific Steering Committee, whose members are the scientific leaders of participating projects and other leaders in the field of epigenetics, as well as a Data Coordination Center. Additional expertise is contributed by workgroups composed of members of participating research projects.

IHEC interacts and coordinates its efforts with other large-scale international genomics projects, such as the International Cancer Genome Consortium (ICGC), ENCODE, and the Global Alliance for Genomics and Health. Committee and workgroup members, as well as other individuals involved in IHEC, meet annually at an event hosted by member countries on a rotating basis. Most meetings are hosted in conjunction with a scientific symposium, some of which are open to non-IHEC scientists and sometimes members of the public.

== Goals ==
The ultimate objective of IHEC is to determine how the Epigenome has shaped human populations over generations and in response to the environment. The first phase of IHEC's operations involves coordinating the production of at least 1,000 reference epigenomes from healthy and diseased human cells, as well as a limited number of model organisms relevant to specific human diseases. The initial focus is on cellular states including stemness, immortality, proliferation, differentiation, senescence, and stress. The reference epigenome for each sample comprises high resolution maps of DNA methylation and key regulatory histone modifications, with corresponding information about the type and expression level of all transcribed genes (protein coding as well as non-coding / small RNAs). The data produced are made freely available to the research community via the IHEC Data Portal, European Genome-phenome Archive (EGA), and other venues.

In addition, participating research projects are engaged in developing new epigenomics and associated bioinformatics methods.

In November 2016 IHEC members from Canada, the European Union's BLUEPRINT Consortium, the German Epigenome Program “DEEP”, Japan, Singapore, and the United States published a group of 41 coordinated papers in Cell Press and other journals. The papers included descriptions of molecular biology and computational methods as well as new research on normal and disease biology.

== See also ==
- Human epigenome
