= Gene regulatory circuit =

Functional clusters of genes

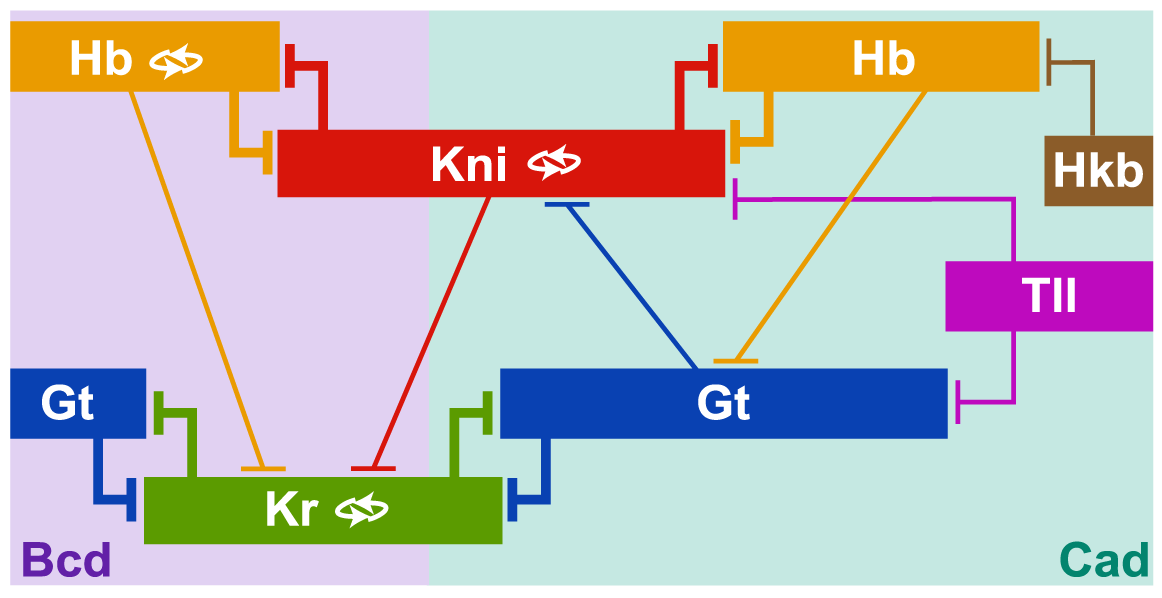
Example of a genetic regulatory circuit for Drosophila melanogaster's huckebein (hkb) gene's effects on gap gene expression.

Genetic regulatory circuits (also referred to as transcriptional regulatory circuits) is a concept that evolved from the Operon Model discovered by François Jacob and Jacques Monod. They are functional clusters of genes that impact each other's expression through inducible transcription factors and cis-regulatory elements.

Genetic regulatory circuits are analogous in many ways to electronic circuits in how they use signal inputs and outputs to determine gene regulation. Like electronic circuits, their organization determines their efficiency, and this has been demonstrated in circuits working in series to have a greater sensitivity of gene regulation. They also use inputs such as trans and cis sequence regulators of genes, and outputs such as gene expression level. Depending on the type of circuit, they respond constantly to outside signals, such as sugars and hormone levels, that determine how the circuit will return to its fixed point or periodic equilibrium state. Genetic regulatory circuits also have an ability to be evolutionarily rewired without the loss of the original transcriptional output level. This rewiring is defined by the change in regulatory-target gene interactions, while there is still conservation of regulatory factors and target genes.

== In-silico application ==
These circuits can be modelled in silico to predict the dynamics of a genetic system. Having constructed a computational model of the natural circuit of interest, one can use the model to make testable predictions about circuit performance. When designing a synthetic circuit for a specific engineering task, a model is useful for identifying necessary connections and parameter operating regimes that give rise to a desired functional output. Similarly, when studying a natural circuit, one can use the model to identify the parts or parameter values necessary for a desired biological outcome. In other words, computational modelling and experimental synthetic perturbations can be used to probe biological circuits. However, the structure of the circuits have shown to not be a reliable indicator of the function that the regulatory circuit provides for the larger cellular regulatory network.

== Engineering and synthetic biology ==
Understanding of genetic regulatory circuits are key in the field of synthetic biology, where disparate genetic elements are combined to produce novel biological functions. These biological gene circuits can be used synthetically to act as physical models for studying regulatory function.

By engineering genetic regulatory circuits, cells can be modified to take information from their environment, such as nutrient availability and developmental signals, and react in accordance to changes in their surroundings . In plant synthetic biology, genetic regulatory circuits can be used to program traits to increase crop plant efficiency by increasing their robustness to environmental stressors. Additionally, they are used to produce biopharmaceuticals for medical intervention.
