= Behavioural responses to stress =

Behavioural responses to stress are evoked from underlying complex physiological changes that arise consequently from stress.

Real or perceived threat in the environment elicits stress response in animals, which disrupts internal homeostasis. Physiological changes cause behavioural responses in animals, including: impairment of response inhibition and lack of motivation, as well as changes in social, sexual, aggression and nurture behaviour in animals. The extent of the impact is dependent upon the type and duration of the stress, as well as the animal's past experiences. Behavioural responses to prolonged stress can also be transferred across generations.

== Overview ==
A stress, as defined to Walter Cannon (1871–1945), is any disturbance that imbalances the internal environment of an organism (i.e. their homeostasis). There are two major types of stressors that cause stress to animals: abiotic stressors and biotic stressors. Abiotic stressors are any ecological, geological, or climate changes that causes stress to the animal, such as increased temperatures and natural disasters. Biotic stressors are living things related complications that causes stress, such as dominance, pollution, infection, social pressures, and competition. Animals can respond with physiological responses, behavioural responses, psychological responses, or physical responses (fight-or-flight). Canon argued that there are two possible choices that an organism may choose when stress is encountered: fight responses or flight responses.

== Behavioural responses ==
Behavioural responses to stress are evoked from some underlying complex physiological changes that arise consequently from stress.

=== Impairment of response inhibition and lack of motivation ===
According to a study conducted by Mika and his colleagues, prolonged stress in rats causes response inhibition. It was evident through their experiment that stressed rats had inhibited premature responses (decreased timing of intervals to food), along with decreased intrinsic motivation to initiate a response. They link the decreased motivation to the stress-associated reduction in incentive motivation, as presented by another study conducted by Kleen and his colleagues. Decreased motivation was also seen in a study conducted by Beery and Kaufer, where they explained that stressed rodents are less likely to be motivated to interact with one another.

=== Change in social behaviours ===
Beery and Kaufer noted that social withdrawal and general reduction in social interaction after an exposure to a stressor are evident in rodents. They argue that this is due to the underlying physiological changes that the rodent goes through in response to stress. For instance, the changes that occur to the hypothalamic-pituitary-adrenal (HPA) hormonal axis is directly related to the changes in social behaviour. Social avoidance is another consequence of stress that can be seen in rodents. Rodents are more likely to avoid dominant rats and avoid social interactions amongst each other after the exposure to a stressor.

=== Sexual behaviours ===
Sexual interests change in many species when exposed to stressors. For instance, stressed male and female rats express inhibited mating behaviour, which is evident through the clear increase in the inhibitory hormone RF-amide. Another study suggests that masculine sexual behaviour in male rats is subject to changes in accordance to the type of stressors that the rats were subjected to. The female zebra finch's mating choice is determined by the stressors that they are exposed to early in life, which remain consistent throughout adulthood. A study about stress effects on female songbird's response to sexual signal for mating indicated that the response to this specific signal can be impaired if the female is exposed to developmental stress. Behavioural changes as a result from developmental stress impairs neural responses to sexual signals, which reduces mating.

=== Aggressive behaviours and anti-predator responses ===
Stressed animals would choose to avoid a novel situation rather than confront it. Aggressive behaviour is associated with sex hormones, such as testosterone, and specific brain regions and systems, such as the medial preoptic nucleus, prefrontal cortex-dependent response inhibition, and anterior hypothalamus. Stress negatively impacts sex hormones, which results in an imbalance and reduction in aggression related hormones and function. Also, chronic stress results in prefrontal cortex-dependent response inhibition. This results in reduction in aggression, thus promoting anti-predator responses. A different response to aggression may be observed in other species when it is socially-induced between individuals in the same social group. In gregarious species, such as the spotted hyena, aggression may be emitted between individuals to reduce stress and lower cortisol levels in the aggressor.

=== Prolonged stress reduces parental behaviour toward offspring ===
Prolonged stress alters parental behaviour toward offspring and promotes parental neglect. According to a study performed by Tilgar and associates, predation stress alters parents' behaviours, such as the reduction in provisioning rates, which negatively impacts the offspring's performance. The hormones oxytocin and vasopressin are generally responsible for affiliative and pair-bonding behaviours in many species. Stress alters the level of both hormones, resulting in an abnormal behaviour from parents towards offspring. For instance, levels of oxytocin decrease as a result of prolonged stress, which has been shown to reduce pair-bonding behaviour and increase withdrawal behaviour. Prolactin is another important hormone that is associated with nurture by parents to offspring, and levels of this hormone can be altered as a result of stress. Reduced levels of prolactin as a result of stress decreases behaviours such as suckling, licking, and brooding.

== Transgenerational responses ==
Behavioural response to stress can be transmitted from parents to offspring. When an offspring observes the expression of behaviour such as fear in response to a stress stimulus, the same response would be elicited in the offspring when the stimulus is presented. Debeik and associates illustrated in rodents that fear is transferred from mother to infant in response to a certain odour stimulus. They further proved that the neural activity, such as the basal amygdala activity of the offspring's brain, illustrated fear response.
