= List of human protein-coding genes 4 =

Human protein-coding genes listed in the HGNC database
index	Gene symbol	HGNC and UniProt ID(s)
6751	GTPBP6	HGNC:30189; O43824
6752	GTPBP8	HGNC:25007; Q8N3Z3
6753	GTPBP10	HGNC:25106; A4D1E9
6754	GTSE1	HGNC:13698; Q9NYZ3
6755	GTSF1	HGNC:26565; Q8WW33
6756	GTSF1L	HGNC:16198; Q9H1H1
6757	GUCA1A	HGNC:4678; P43080
6758	GUCA1B	HGNC:4679; Q9UMX6
6759	GUCA1C	HGNC:4680; O95843
6760	GUCA2A	HGNC:4682; Q02747
6761	GUCA2B	HGNC:4683; Q16661
6762	GUCD1	HGNC:14237; Q96NT3
6763	GUCY1A1	HGNC:4685; Q02108
6764	GUCY1A2	HGNC:4684; P33402
6765	GUCY1B1	HGNC:4687; Q02153
6766	GUCY2C	HGNC:4688; P25092
6767	GUCY2D	HGNC:4689; Q02846
6768	GUCY2F	HGNC:4691; P51841
6769	GUF1	HGNC:25799; Q8N442
6770	GUK1	HGNC:4693; Q16774
6771	GULP1	HGNC:18649; Q9UBP9
6772	GUSB	HGNC:4696; P08236
6773	GVQW3	HGNC:51239; Q3ZCU0
6774	GXYLT1	HGNC:27482; Q4G148
6775	GXYLT2	HGNC:33383; A0PJZ3
6776	GYG1	HGNC:4699; P46976
6777	GYG2	HGNC:4700; O15488
6778	GYPA	HGNC:4702; P02724
6779	GYPB	HGNC:4703; P06028
6780	GYPC	HGNC:4704; P04921
6781	GYPE	HGNC:4705; P15421
6782	GYS1	HGNC:4706; P13807
6783	GYS2	HGNC:4707; P54840
6784	GZF1	HGNC:15808; Q9H116
6785	GZMA	HGNC:4708; P12544
6786	GZMB	HGNC:4709; P10144
6787	GZMH	HGNC:4710; P20718
6788	GZMK	HGNC:4711; P49863
6789	GZMM	HGNC:4712; P51124
6790	H1-0	HGNC:4714; P07305
6791	H1-1	HGNC:4715; Q02539
6792	H1-2	HGNC:4716; P16403
6793	H1-3	HGNC:4717; P16402
6794	H1-4	HGNC:4718; P10412
6795	H1-5	HGNC:4719; P16401
6796	H1-6	HGNC:4720; P22492
6797	H1-7	HGNC:24893; Q75WM6
6798	H1-8	HGNC:18463; Q8IZA3
6799	H1-10	HGNC:4722; Q92522
6800	H2AB1	HGNC:22516; P0C5Y9
6801	H2AB2	HGNC:18298; P0C5Z0
6802	H2AB3	HGNC:14455; P0C5Z0
6803	H2AC1	HGNC:18729; Q96QV6
6804	H2AC4	HGNC:4734; P04908
6805	H2AC6	HGNC:4733; Q93077
6806	H2AC7	HGNC:4729; P20671
6807	H2AC8	HGNC:4724; P04908
6808	H2AC11	HGNC:4737; P0C0S8
6809	H2AC12	HGNC:13671; Q96KK5
6810	H2AC13	HGNC:4725; P0C0S8
6811	H2AC14	HGNC:4727; Q99878
6812	H2AC15	HGNC:4726; P0C0S8
6813	H2AC16	HGNC:4730; P0C0S8
6814	H2AC17	HGNC:4735; P0C0S8
6815	H2AC18	HGNC:4736; Q6FI13
6816	H2AC19	HGNC:29668; Q6FI13
6817	H2AC20	HGNC:4738; Q16777
6818	H2AC21	HGNC:20508; Q8IUE6
6819	H2AC25	HGNC:20507; Q7L7L0
6820	H2AJ	HGNC:14456; Q9BTM1
6821	H2AL3	HGNC:53960; A0A3B3IU63
6822	H2AP	HGNC:18417; O75409
6823	H2AX	HGNC:4739; P16104
6824	H2AZ1	HGNC:4741; P0C0S5
6825	H2AZ2	HGNC:20664; Q71UI9
6826	H2BC1	HGNC:18730; Q96A08
6827	H2BC3	HGNC:4751; P33778
6828	H2BC4	HGNC:4757; P62807
6829	H2BC5	HGNC:4747; P58876
6830	H2BC6	HGNC:4753; P62807
6831	H2BC7	HGNC:4752; P62807
6832	H2BC8	HGNC:4746; P62807
6833	H2BC9	HGNC:4755; Q93079
6834	H2BC10	HGNC:4756; P62807
6835	H2BC11	HGNC:4761; P06899
6836	H2BC12	HGNC:13954; O60814
6837	H2BC12L	HGNC:4762; P57053
6838	H2BC13	HGNC:4748; Q99880
6839	H2BC14	HGNC:4750; Q99879
6840	H2BC15	HGNC:4749; Q99877
6841	H2BC17	HGNC:4758; P23527
6842	H2BC18	HGNC:24700; Q5QNW6
6843	H2BC21	HGNC:4760; Q16778
6844	H2BC26	HGNC:20514; Q8N257
6845	H2BK1	HGNC:53833; A0A2R8Y619
6846	H2BN1	HGNC:56200; P0DW85
6847	H2BW1	HGNC:27252; Q7Z2G1
6848	H2BW2	HGNC:27867; P0C1H6
6849	H3-3A	HGNC:4764; P84243
6850	H3-3B	HGNC:4765; P84243
6851	H3-4	HGNC:4778; Q16695
6852	H3-5	HGNC:33164; Q6NXT2
6853	H3-7	HGNC:32060; Q5TEC6
6854	H3C1	HGNC:4766; P68431
6855	H3C2	HGNC:4776; P68431
6856	H3C3	HGNC:4768; P68431
6857	H3C4	HGNC:4767; P68431
6858	H3C6	HGNC:4769; P68431
6859	H3C7	HGNC:4773; P68431
6860	H3C8	HGNC:4772; P68431
6861	H3C10	HGNC:4775; P68431
6862	H3C11	HGNC:4771; P68431
6863	H3C12	HGNC:4774; P68431
6864	H3C13	HGNC:25311; Q71DI3
6865	H3C14	HGNC:20503; Q71DI3
6866	H3C15	HGNC:20505; Q71DI3
6867	H3Y1	HGNC:43735; P0DPK2
6868	H3Y2	HGNC:43734; P0DPK5
6869	H4C1	HGNC:4781; P62805
6870	H4C2	HGNC:4789; P62805
6871	H4C3	HGNC:4787; P62805
6872	H4C4	HGNC:4782; P62805
6873	H4C5	HGNC:4790; P62805
6874	H4C6	HGNC:4783; P62805
6875	H4C7	HGNC:4792; Q99525
6876	H4C8	HGNC:4788; P62805
6877	H4C9	HGNC:4793; P62805
6878	H4C11	HGNC:4785; P62805
6879	H4C12	HGNC:4784; P62805
6880	H4C13	HGNC:4791; P62805
6881	H4C14	HGNC:4794; P62805
6882	H4C15	HGNC:29607; P62805
6883	H4C16	HGNC:20510; P62805
6884	H6PD	HGNC:4795; O95479
6885	HAAO	HGNC:4796; P46952
6886	HABP2	HGNC:4798; Q14520
6887	HABP4	HGNC:17062; Q5JVS0
6888	HACD1	HGNC:9639; B0YJ81
6889	HACD2	HGNC:9640; Q6Y1H2
6890	HACD3	HGNC:24175; Q9P035
6891	HACD4	HGNC:20920; Q5VWC8
6892	HACE1	HGNC:21033; Q8IYU2
6893	HACL1	HGNC:17856; Q9UJ83
6894	HACL2	HGNC:6041; A1L0T0
6895	HADH	HGNC:4799; Q16836
6896	HADHA	HGNC:4801; P40939
6897	HADHB	HGNC:4803; P55084
6898	HAGH	HGNC:4805; Q16775
6899	HAGHL	HGNC:14177; Q6PII5
6900	HAL	HGNC:4806; P42357
6901	HAMP	HGNC:15598; P81172
6902	HAND1	HGNC:4807; O96004
6903	HAND2	HGNC:4808; P61296
6904	HAO1	HGNC:4809; Q9UJM8
6905	HAO2	HGNC:4810; Q9NYQ3
6906	HAP1	HGNC:4812; P54257
6907	HAPLN1	HGNC:2380; P10915
6908	HAPLN2	HGNC:17410; Q9GZV7
6909	HAPLN3	HGNC:21446; Q96S86
6910	HAPLN4	HGNC:31357; Q86UW8
6911	HAPSTR1	HGNC:30103; Q14CZ0
6912	HAPSTR2	HGNC:55138; A0A7P0TBJ1
6913	HARBI1	HGNC:26522; Q96MB7
6914	HARS1	HGNC:4816; P12081
6915	HARS2	HGNC:4817; P49590
6916	HAS1	HGNC:4818; Q92839
6917	HAS2	HGNC:4819; Q92819
6918	HAS3	HGNC:4820; O00219
6919	HASPIN	HGNC:19682; Q8TF76
6920	HAT1	HGNC:4821; O14929
6921	HAUS1	HGNC:25174; Q96CS2
6922	HAUS2	HGNC:25530; Q9NVX0
6923	HAUS3	HGNC:28719; Q68CZ6
6924	HAUS4	HGNC:20163; Q9H6D7
6925	HAUS5	HGNC:29130; O94927
6926	HAUS6	HGNC:25948; Q7Z4H7
6927	HAUS7	HGNC:32979; Q99871
6928	HAUS8	HGNC:30532; Q9BT25
6929	HAVCR1	HGNC:17866; Q96D42
6930	HAVCR2	HGNC:18437; Q8TDQ0
6931	HAX1	HGNC:16915; O00165
6932	HBA1	HGNC:4823; P69905
6933	HBA2	HGNC:4824; P69905
6934	HBB	HGNC:4827; P68871
6935	HBD	HGNC:4829; P02042
6936	HBE1	HGNC:4830; P02100
6937	HBEGF	HGNC:3059; Q99075
6938	HBG1	HGNC:4831; P69891
6939	HBG2	HGNC:4832; P69892
6940	HBM	HGNC:4826; Q6B0K9
6941	HBP1	HGNC:23200; O60381
6942	HBQ1	HGNC:4833; P09105
6943	HBS1L	HGNC:4834; Q9Y450
6944	HBZ	HGNC:4835; P02008
6945	HCAR1	HGNC:4532; Q9BXC0
6946	HCAR2	HGNC:24827; Q8TDS4
6947	HCAR3	HGNC:16824; P49019
6948	HCCS	HGNC:4837; P53701
6949	HCFC1	HGNC:4839; P51610
6950	HCFC1R1	HGNC:21198; Q9NWW0
6951	HCFC2	HGNC:24972; Q9Y5Z7
6952	HCK	HGNC:4840; P08631
6953	HCLS1	HGNC:4844; P14317
6954	HCN1	HGNC:4845; O60741
6955	HCN2	HGNC:4846; Q9UL51
6956	HCN3	HGNC:19183; Q9P1Z3
6957	HCN4	HGNC:16882; Q9Y3Q4
6958	HCRT	HGNC:4847; O43612
6959	HCRTR1	HGNC:4848; O43613
6960	HCRTR2	HGNC:4849; O43614
6961	HCST	HGNC:16977; Q9UBK5
6962	HDAC1	HGNC:4852; Q13547
6963	HDAC2	HGNC:4853; Q92769
6964	HDAC3	HGNC:4854; O15379
6965	HDAC4	HGNC:14063; P56524
6966	HDAC5	HGNC:14068; Q9UQL6
6967	HDAC6	HGNC:14064; Q9UBN7
6968	HDAC7	HGNC:14067; Q8WUI4
6969	HDAC8	HGNC:13315; Q9BY41
6970	HDAC9	HGNC:14065; Q9UKV0
6971	HDAC10	HGNC:18128; Q969S8
6972	HDAC11	HGNC:19086; Q96DB2
6973	HDC	HGNC:4855; P19113
6974	HDDC2	HGNC:21078; Q7Z4H3
6975	HDDC3	HGNC:30522; Q8N4P3
6976	HDGF	HGNC:4856; P51858
6977	HDGFL1	HGNC:21095; Q5TGJ6
6978	HDGFL2	HGNC:14680; Q7Z4V5
6979	HDGFL3	HGNC:24937; Q9Y3E1
6980	HDHD2	HGNC:25364; Q9H0R4
6981	HDHD3	HGNC:28171; Q9BSH5
6982	HDHD5	HGNC:1843; Q9BXW7
6983	HDLBP	HGNC:4857; Q00341
6984	HDX	HGNC:26411; Q7Z353
6985	HEATR1	HGNC:25517; Q9H583
6986	HEATR3	HGNC:26087; Q7Z4Q2
6987	HEATR4	HGNC:16761; Q86WZ0
6988	HEATR5A	HGNC:20276; Q86XA9
6989	HEATR5B	HGNC:29273; Q9P2D3
6990	HEATR6	HGNC:24076; Q6AI08
6991	HEATR9	HGNC:26548; A2RTY3
6992	HEBP1	HGNC:17176; Q9NRV9
6993	HEBP2	HGNC:15716; Q9Y5Z4
6994	HECA	HGNC:21041; Q9UBI9
6995	HECTD1	HGNC:20157; Q9ULT8
6996	HECTD2	HGNC:26736; Q5U5R9
6997	HECTD3	HGNC:26117; Q5T447
6998	HECTD4	HGNC:26611; Q9Y4D8
6999	HECW1	HGNC:22195; Q76N89
7000	HECW2	HGNC:29853; Q9P2P5
7001	HEG1	HGNC:29227; Q9ULI3
7002	HELB	HGNC:17196; Q8NG08
7003	HELLS	HGNC:4861; Q9NRZ9
7004	HELQ	HGNC:18536; Q8TDG4
7005	HELT	HGNC:33783; A6NFD8
7006	HELZ	HGNC:16878; P42694
7007	HELZ2	HGNC:30021; Q9BYK8
7008	HEMGN	HGNC:17509; Q9BXL5
7009	HEMK1	HGNC:24923; Q9Y5R4
7010	HEMK2	HGNC:16021; Q9Y5N5
7011	HENMT1	HGNC:26400; Q5T8I9
7012	HEPACAM	HGNC:26361; Q14CZ8
7013	HEPACAM2	HGNC:27364; A8MVW5
7014	HEPH	HGNC:4866; Q9BQS7
7015	HEPHL1	HGNC:30477; Q6MZM0
7016	HEPN1	HGNC:34400; Q6WQI6
7017	HERC1	HGNC:4867; Q15751
7018	HERC2	HGNC:4868; O95714
7019	HERC3	HGNC:4876; Q15034
7020	HERC4	HGNC:24521; Q5GLZ8
7021	HERC5	HGNC:24368; Q9UII4
7022	HERC6	HGNC:26072; Q8IVU3
7023	HERPUD1	HGNC:13744; Q15011
7024	HERPUD2	HGNC:21915; Q9BSE4
7025	HES1	HGNC:5192; Q14469
7026	HES2	HGNC:16005; Q9Y543
7027	HES3	HGNC:26226; Q5TGS1
7028	HES4	HGNC:24149; Q9HCC6
7029	HES5	HGNC:19764; Q5TA89
7030	HES6	HGNC:18254; Q96HZ4
7031	HES7	HGNC:15977; Q9BYE0
7032	HESX1	HGNC:4877; Q9UBX0
7033	HEXA	HGNC:4878; P06865
7034	HEXB	HGNC:4879; P07686
7035	HEXD	HGNC:26307; Q8WVB3
7036	HEXIM1	HGNC:24953; O94992
7037	HEXIM2	HGNC:28591; Q96MH2
7038	HEY1	HGNC:4880; Q9Y5J3
7039	HEY2	HGNC:4881; Q9UBP5
7040	HEYL	HGNC:4882; Q9NQ87
7041	HFE	HGNC:4886; Q30201
7042	HFM1	HGNC:20193; A2PYH4
7043	HGD	HGNC:4892; Q93099
7044	HGF	HGNC:4893; P14210
7045	HGFAC	HGNC:4894; Q04756
7046	HGH1	HGNC:24161; Q9BTY7
7047	HGS	HGNC:4897; O14964
7048	HGSNAT	HGNC:26527; Q68CP4
7049	HHAT	HGNC:18270; Q5VTY9
7050	HHATL	HGNC:13242; Q9HCP6
7051	HHEX	HGNC:4901; Q03014
7052	HHIP	HGNC:14866; Q96QV1
7053	HHIPL1	HGNC:19710; Q96JK4
7054	HHIPL2	HGNC:25842; Q6UWX4
7055	HHLA1	HGNC:4904; C9JL84
7056	HHLA2	HGNC:4905; Q9UM44
7057	HIBADH	HGNC:4907; P31937
7058	HIBCH	HGNC:4908; Q6NVY1
7059	HIC1	HGNC:4909; Q14526
7060	HIC2	HGNC:18595; Q96JB3
7061	HID1	HGNC:15736; Q8IV36
7062	HIF1A	HGNC:4910; Q16665
7063	HIF1AN	HGNC:17113; Q9NWT6
7064	HIF3A	HGNC:15825; Q9Y2N7
7065	HIGD1A	HGNC:29527; Q9Y241
7066	HIGD1B	HGNC:24318; Q9P298
7067	HIGD1C	HGNC:28044; A8MV81
7068	HIGD2A	HGNC:28311; Q9BW72
7069	HIGD2B	HGNC:26984; Q4VC39
7070	HIKESHI	HGNC:26938; Q53FT3
7071	HILPDA	HGNC:28859; Q9Y5L2
7072	HINFP	HGNC:17850; Q9BQA5
7073	HINT1	HGNC:4912; P49773
7074	HINT2	HGNC:18344; Q9BX68
7075	HINT3	HGNC:18468; Q9NQE9
7076	HIP1	HGNC:4913; O00291
7077	HIP1R	HGNC:18415; O75146
7078	HIPK1	HGNC:19006; Q86Z02
7079	HIPK2	HGNC:14402; Q9H2X6
7080	HIPK3	HGNC:4915; Q9H422
7081	HIPK4	HGNC:19007; Q8NE63
7082	HIRA	HGNC:4916; P54198
7083	HIRIP3	HGNC:4917; Q9BW71
7084	HIVEP1	HGNC:4920; P15822
7085	HIVEP2	HGNC:4921; P31629
7086	HIVEP3	HGNC:13561; Q5T1R4
7087	HJURP	HGNC:25444; Q8NCD3
7088	HJV	HGNC:4887; Q6ZVN8
7089	HK1	HGNC:4922; P19367
7090	HK2	HGNC:4923; P52789
7091	HK3	HGNC:4925; P52790
7092	HKDC1	HGNC:23302; Q2TB90
7093	HLA-A	HGNC:4931; P04439
7094	HLA-B	HGNC:4932; P01889
7095	HLA-C	HGNC:4933; P10321
7096	HLA-DMA	HGNC:4934; P28067
7097	HLA-DMB	HGNC:4935; P28068
7098	HLA-DOA	HGNC:4936; P06340
7099	HLA-DOB	HGNC:4937; P13765
7100	HLA-DPA1	HGNC:4938; P20036
7101	HLA-DPB1	HGNC:4940; P04440
7102	HLA-DQA1	HGNC:4942; P01909
7103	HLA-DQA2	HGNC:4943; P01906
7104	HLA-DQB1	HGNC:4944; P01920
7105	HLA-DQB2	HGNC:4945; P05538
7106	HLA-DRA	HGNC:4947; P01903
7107	HLA-DRB1	HGNC:4948; P01911
7108	HLA-DRB5	HGNC:4953; Q30154
7109	HLA-E	HGNC:4962; P13747
7110	HLA-F	HGNC:4963; P30511
7111	HLA-G	HGNC:4964; P17693
7112	HLCS	HGNC:4976; P50747
7113	HLF	HGNC:4977; Q16534
7114	HLTF	HGNC:11099; Q14527
7115	HLX	HGNC:4978; Q14774
7116	HM13	HGNC:16435; Q8TCT9
7117	HMBOX1	HGNC:26137; Q6NT76
7118	HMBS	HGNC:4982; P08397
7119	HMCES	HGNC:24446; Q96FZ2
7120	HMCN1	HGNC:19194; Q96RW7
7121	HMCN2	HGNC:21293; Q8NDA2
7122	HMG20A	HGNC:5001; Q9NP66
7123	HMG20B	HGNC:5002; Q9P0W2
7124	HMGA1	HGNC:5010; P17096
7125	HMGA2	HGNC:5009; P52926
7126	HMGB1	HGNC:4983; P09429
7127	HMGB2	HGNC:5000; P26583
7128	HMGB3	HGNC:5004; O15347
7129	HMGB4	HGNC:24954; Q8WW32
7130	HMGCL	HGNC:5005; P35914
7131	HMGCLL1	HGNC:21359; Q8TB92
7132	HMGCR	HGNC:5006; P04035
7133	HMGCS1	HGNC:5007; Q01581
7134	HMGCS2	HGNC:5008; P54868
7135	HMGN1	HGNC:4984; P05114
7136	HMGN2	HGNC:4986; P05204
7137	HMGN3	HGNC:12312; Q15651
7138	HMGN4	HGNC:4989; O00479
7139	HMGN5	HGNC:8013; P82970
7140	HMGXB3	HGNC:28982; Q12766
7141	HMGXB4	HGNC:5003; Q9UGU5
7142	HMHB1	HGNC:29677; O97980
7143	HMMR	HGNC:5012; O75330
7144	HMOX1	HGNC:5013; P09601
7145	HMOX2	HGNC:5014; P30519
7146	HMSD	HGNC:23037; A8MTL9, P0C7T4
7147	HMX1	HGNC:5017; Q9NP08
7148	HMX2	HGNC:5018; A2RU54
7149	HMX3	HGNC:5019; A6NHT5
7150	HNF1A	HGNC:11621; P20823
7151	HNF1B	HGNC:11630; P35680
7152	HNF4A	HGNC:5024; P41235
7153	HNF4G	HGNC:5026; Q14541
7154	HNMT	HGNC:5028; P50135
7155	HNRNPA0	HGNC:5030; Q13151
7156	HNRNPA1	HGNC:5031; P09651
7157	HNRNPA1L2	HGNC:27067; Q32P51
7158	HNRNPA1L3	HGNC:48778; A0A2R8Y4L2
7159	HNRNPA2B1	HGNC:5033; P22626
7160	HNRNPA3	HGNC:24941; P51991
7161	HNRNPAB	HGNC:5034; Q99729
7162	HNRNPC	HGNC:5035; P07910
7163	HNRNPCL1	HGNC:29295; O60812
7164	HNRNPCL2	HGNC:48813; B2RXH8
7165	HNRNPCL3	HGNC:51235; B7ZW38
7166	HNRNPCL4	HGNC:51333; P0DMR1
7167	HNRNPD	HGNC:5036; Q14103
7168	HNRNPDL	HGNC:5037; O14979
7169	HNRNPF	HGNC:5039; P52597
7170	HNRNPH1	HGNC:5041; P31943
7171	HNRNPH2	HGNC:5042; P55795
7172	HNRNPH3	HGNC:5043; P31942
7173	HNRNPK	HGNC:5044; P61978
7174	HNRNPL	HGNC:5045; P14866
7175	HNRNPLL	HGNC:25127; Q8WVV9
7176	HNRNPM	HGNC:5046; P52272
7177	HNRNPR	HGNC:5047; O43390
7178	HNRNPU	HGNC:5048; Q00839
7179	HNRNPUL1	HGNC:17011; Q9BUJ2
7180	HNRNPUL2	HGNC:25451; Q1KMD3
7181	HOATZ	HGNC:25061; Q6PI97
7182	HOGA1	HGNC:25155; Q86XE5
7183	HOMER1	HGNC:17512; Q86YM7
7184	HOMER2	HGNC:17513; Q9NSB8
7185	HOMER3	HGNC:17514; Q9NSC5
7186	HOMEZ	HGNC:20164; Q8IX15
7187	HOOK1	HGNC:19884; Q9UJC3
7188	HOOK2	HGNC:19885; Q96ED9
7189	HOOK3	HGNC:23576; Q86VS8
7190	HOPX	HGNC:24961; Q9BPY8
7191	HORMAD1	HGNC:25245; Q86X24
7192	HORMAD2	HGNC:28383; Q8N7B1
7193	HOXA1	HGNC:5099; P49639
7194	HOXA2	HGNC:5103; O43364
7195	HOXA3	HGNC:5104; O43365
7196	HOXA4	HGNC:5105; Q00056
7197	HOXA5	HGNC:5106; P20719
7198	HOXA6	HGNC:5107; P31267
7199	HOXA7	HGNC:5108; P31268
7200	HOXA9	HGNC:5109; P31269
7201	HOXA10	HGNC:5100; P31260
7202	HOXA11	HGNC:5101; P31270
7203	HOXA13	HGNC:5102; P31271
7204	HOXB1	HGNC:5111; P14653
7205	HOXB2	HGNC:5113; P14652
7206	HOXB3	HGNC:5114; P14651
7207	HOXB4	HGNC:5115; P17483
7208	HOXB5	HGNC:5116; P09067
7209	HOXB6	HGNC:5117; P17509
7210	HOXB7	HGNC:5118; P09629
7211	HOXB8	HGNC:5119; P17481
7212	HOXB9	HGNC:5120; P17482
7213	HOXB13	HGNC:5112; Q92826
7214	HOXC4	HGNC:5126; P09017
7215	HOXC5	HGNC:5127; Q00444
7216	HOXC6	HGNC:5128; P09630
7217	HOXC8	HGNC:5129; P31273
7218	HOXC9	HGNC:5130; P31274
7219	HOXC10	HGNC:5122; Q9NYD6
7220	HOXC11	HGNC:5123; O43248
7221	HOXC12	HGNC:5124; P31275
7222	HOXC13	HGNC:5125; P31276
7223	HOXD1	HGNC:5132; Q9GZZ0
7224	HOXD3	HGNC:5137; P31249
7225	HOXD4	HGNC:5138; P09016
7226	HOXD8	HGNC:5139; P13378
7227	HOXD9	HGNC:5140; P28356
7228	HOXD10	HGNC:5133; P28358
7229	HOXD11	HGNC:5134; P31277
7230	HOXD12	HGNC:5135; P35452
7231	HOXD13	HGNC:5136; P35453
7232	HP	HGNC:5141; P00738
7233	HP1BP3	HGNC:24973; Q5SSJ5
7234	HPCA	HGNC:5144; P84074
7235	HPCAL1	HGNC:5145; P37235
7236	HPCAL4	HGNC:18212; Q9UM19
7237	HPD	HGNC:5147; P32754
7238	HPDL	HGNC:28242; Q96IR7
7239	HPF1	HGNC:26051; Q9NWY4
7240	HPGD	HGNC:5154; P15428
7241	HPGDS	HGNC:17890; O60760
7242	HPN	HGNC:5155; P05981
7243	HPR	HGNC:5156; P00739
7244	HPRT1	HGNC:5157; P00492
7245	HPS1	HGNC:5163; Q92902
7246	HPS3	HGNC:15597; Q969F9
7247	HPS4	HGNC:15844; Q9NQG7
7248	HPS5	HGNC:17022; Q9UPZ3
7249	HPS6	HGNC:18817; Q86YV9
7250	HPSE	HGNC:5164; Q9Y251
7251	HPSE2	HGNC:18374; Q8WWQ2
7252	HPX	HGNC:5171; P02790
7253	HR	HGNC:5172; O43593
7254	HRAS	HGNC:5173; P01112
7255	HRC	HGNC:5178; P23327
7256	HRCT1	HGNC:33872; Q6UXD1
7257	HRG	HGNC:5181; P04196
7258	HRH1	HGNC:5182; P35367
7259	HRH2	HGNC:5183; P25021
7260	HRH3	HGNC:5184; Q9Y5N1
7261	HRH4	HGNC:17383; Q9H3N8
7262	HRK	HGNC:5185; O00198
7263	HRNR	HGNC:20846; Q86YZ3
7264	HROB	HGNC:28460; Q8N3J3
7265	HRURF	HGNC:55085; P0DUH7
7266	HS1BP3	HGNC:24979; Q53T59
7267	HS2ST1	HGNC:5193; Q7LGA3
7268	HS3ST1	HGNC:5194; O14792
7269	HS3ST2	HGNC:5195; Q9Y278
7270	HS3ST3A1	HGNC:5196; Q9Y663
7271	HS3ST3B1	HGNC:5198; Q9Y662
7272	HS3ST4	HGNC:5200; Q9Y661
7273	HS3ST5	HGNC:19419; Q8IZT8
7274	HS3ST6	HGNC:14178; Q96QI5
7275	HS6ST1	HGNC:5201; O60243
7276	HS6ST2	HGNC:19133; Q96MM7
7277	HS6ST3	HGNC:19134; Q8IZP7
7278	HSBP1	HGNC:5203; O75506
7279	HSBP1L1	HGNC:37243; C9JCN9
7280	HSCB	HGNC:28913; Q8IWL3
7281	HSD3B1	HGNC:5217; P14060
7282	HSD3B2	HGNC:5218; P26439
7283	HSD3B7	HGNC:18324; Q9H2F3
7284	HSD11B1	HGNC:5208; P28845
7285	HSD11B1L	HGNC:30419; Q7Z5J1
7286	HSD11B2	HGNC:5209; P80365
7287	HSD17B1	HGNC:5210; P14061
7288	HSD17B2	HGNC:5211; P37059
7289	HSD17B3	HGNC:5212; P37058
7290	HSD17B4	HGNC:5213; P51659
7291	HSD17B6	HGNC:23316; O14756
7292	HSD17B7	HGNC:5215; P56937
7293	HSD17B8	HGNC:3554
7294	HSD17B10	HGNC:4800; Q99714
7295	HSD17B11	HGNC:22960; Q8NBQ5
7296	HSD17B12	HGNC:18646; Q53GQ0
7297	HSD17B13	HGNC:18685; Q7Z5P4
7298	HSD17B14	HGNC:23238; Q9BPX1
7299	HSDL1	HGNC:16475; Q3SXM5
7300	HSDL2	HGNC:18572; Q6YN16
7301	HSF1	HGNC:5224; Q00613
7302	HSF2	HGNC:5225; Q03933
7303	HSF2BP	HGNC:5226; O75031
7304	HSF4	HGNC:5227; Q9ULV5
7305	HSF5	HGNC:26862; Q4G112
7306	HSFX1	HGNC:29603; Q9UBD0
7307	HSFX2	HGNC:32701; Q9UBD0
7308	HSFX3	HGNC:52395; A0A1B0GWH4
7309	HSFX4	HGNC:52398; A0A1B0GTS1
7310	HSFY1	HGNC:18568; Q96LI6
7311	HSFY2	HGNC:23950; Q96LI6
7312	HSH2D	HGNC:24920; Q96JZ2
7313	HSP90AA1	HGNC:5253; P07900
7314	HSP90AB1	HGNC:5258; P08238
7315	HSP90B1	HGNC:12028; P14625
7316	HSPA1A	HGNC:5232; P0DMV8
7317	HSPA1B	HGNC:5233; P0DMV9
7318	HSPA1L	HGNC:5234; P34931
7319	HSPA2	HGNC:5235; P54652
7320	HSPA4	HGNC:5237; P34932
7321	HSPA4L	HGNC:17041; O95757
7322	HSPA5	HGNC:5238; P11021
7323	HSPA6	HGNC:5239; P17066
7324	HSPA8	HGNC:5241; P11142
7325	HSPA9	HGNC:5244; P38646
7326	HSPA12A	HGNC:19022; O43301
7327	HSPA12B	HGNC:16193; Q96MM6
7328	HSPA13	HGNC:11375; P48723
7329	HSPA14	HGNC:29526; Q0VDF9
7330	HSPB1	HGNC:5246; P04792
7331	HSPB2	HGNC:5247; Q16082
7332	HSPB3	HGNC:5248; Q12988
7333	HSPB6	HGNC:26511; O14558
7334	HSPB7	HGNC:5249; Q9UBY9
7335	HSPB8	HGNC:30171; Q9UJY1
7336	HSPB9	HGNC:30589; Q9BQS6
7337	HSPBAP1	HGNC:16389; Q96EW2
7338	HSPBP1	HGNC:24989; Q9NZL4
7339	HSPD1	HGNC:5261; P10809
7340	HSPE1	HGNC:5269; P61604
7341	HSPG2	HGNC:5273; P98160
7342	HSPH1	HGNC:16969; Q92598
7343	HTATIP2	HGNC:16637; Q9BUP3
7344	HTATSF1	HGNC:5276; O43719
7345	HTD2	HGNC:53111; P86397
7346	HTN1	HGNC:5283; P15515
7347	HTN3	HGNC:5284; P15516
7348	HTR1A	HGNC:5286; P08908
7349	HTR1B	HGNC:5287; P28222
7350	HTR1D	HGNC:5289; P28221
7351	HTR1E	HGNC:5291; P28566
7352	HTR1F	HGNC:5292; P30939
7353	HTR2A	HGNC:5293; P28223
7354	HTR2B	HGNC:5294; P41595
7355	HTR2C	HGNC:5295; P28335
7356	HTR3A	HGNC:5297; P46098
7357	HTR3B	HGNC:5298; O95264
7358	HTR3C	HGNC:24003; Q8WXA8
7359	HTR3D	HGNC:24004; Q70Z44
7360	HTR3E	HGNC:24005; A5X5Y0
7361	HTR4	HGNC:5299; Q13639
7362	HTR5A	HGNC:5300; P47898
7363	HTR6	HGNC:5301; P50406
7364	HTR7	HGNC:5302; P34969
7365	HTRA1	HGNC:9476; Q92743
7366	HTRA2	HGNC:14348; O43464
7367	HTRA3	HGNC:30406; P83110
7368	HTRA4	HGNC:26909; P83105
7369	HTT	HGNC:4851; P42858
7370	HUNK	HGNC:13326; P57058
7371	HUS1	HGNC:5309; O60921
7372	HUS1B	HGNC:16485; Q8NHY5
7373	HUWE1	HGNC:30892; Q7Z6Z7
7374	HVCN1	HGNC:28240; Q96D96
7375	HYAL1	HGNC:5320; Q12794
7376	HYAL2	HGNC:5321; Q12891
7377	HYAL3	HGNC:5322; O43820
7378	HYAL4	HGNC:5323; Q2M3T9
7379	HYCC1	HGNC:24587; Q9BYI3
7380	HYCC2	HGNC:28593; Q8IXS8
7381	HYDIN	HGNC:19368; Q4G0P3
7382	HYI	HGNC:26948; Q5T013
7383	HYKK	HGNC:34403; A2RU49
7384	HYLS1	HGNC:26558; Q96M11
7385	HYOU1	HGNC:16931; Q9Y4L1
7386	HYPK	HGNC:18418; Q9NX55
7387	IAH1	HGNC:27696; Q2TAA2
7388	IAPP	HGNC:5329; P10997
7389	IARS1	HGNC:5330; P41252
7390	IARS2	HGNC:29685; Q9NSE4
7391	IBA57	HGNC:27302; Q5T440
7392	IBSP	HGNC:5341; P21815
7393	IBTK	HGNC:17853; Q9P2D0
7394	ICA1	HGNC:5343; Q05084
7395	ICA1L	HGNC:14442; Q8NDH6
7396	ICAM1	HGNC:5344; P05362
7397	ICAM2	HGNC:5345; P13598
7398	ICAM3	HGNC:5346; P32942
7399	ICAM4	HGNC:5347; Q14773
7400	ICAM5	HGNC:5348; Q9UMF0
7401	ICE1	HGNC:29154; Q9Y2F5
7402	ICE2	HGNC:29885; Q659A1
7403	ICMT	HGNC:5350; O60725
7404	ICOS	HGNC:5351; Q9Y6W8
7405	ICOSLG	HGNC:17087; O75144
7406	ID1	HGNC:5360; P41134
7407	ID2	HGNC:5361; Q02363
7408	ID3	HGNC:5362; Q02535
7409	ID4	HGNC:5363; P47928
7410	IDE	HGNC:5381; P14735
7411	IDH1	HGNC:5382; O75874
7412	IDH2	HGNC:5383; P48735
7413	IDH3A	HGNC:5384; P50213
7414	IDH3B	HGNC:5385; O43837
7415	IDH3G	HGNC:5386; P51553
7416	IDI1	HGNC:5387; Q13907
7417	IDI2	HGNC:23487; Q9BXS1
7418	IDNK	HGNC:31367; Q5T6J7
7419	IDO1	HGNC:6059; P14902
7420	IDO2	HGNC:27269; Q6ZQW0
7421	IDS	HGNC:5389; P22304
7422	IDUA	HGNC:5391; P35475
7423	IER2	HGNC:28871; Q9BTL4
7424	IER3	HGNC:5392; P46695
7425	IER3IP1	HGNC:18550; Q9Y5U9
7426	IER5	HGNC:5393; Q5VY09
7427	IER5L	HGNC:23679; Q5T953
7428	IFFO1	HGNC:24970; Q0D2I5
7429	IFFO2	HGNC:27006; Q5TF58
7430	IFI6	HGNC:4054; P09912
7431	IFI16	HGNC:5395; Q16666
7432	IFI27	HGNC:5397; P40305
7433	IFI27L1	HGNC:19754; Q96BM0
7434	IFI27L2	HGNC:19753; Q9H2X8
7435	IFI30	HGNC:5398; P13284
7436	IFI35	HGNC:5399; P80217
7437	IFI44	HGNC:16938; Q8TCB0
7438	IFI44L	HGNC:17817; Q53G44
7439	IFIH1	HGNC:18873; Q9BYX4
7440	IFIT1	HGNC:5407; P09914
7441	IFIT1B	HGNC:23442; Q5T764
7442	IFIT2	HGNC:5409; P09913
7443	IFIT3	HGNC:5411; O14879
7444	IFIT5	HGNC:13328; Q13325
7445	IFITM1	HGNC:5412; P13164
7446	IFITM2	HGNC:5413; Q01629
7447	IFITM3	HGNC:5414; Q01628
7448	IFITM5	HGNC:16644; A6NNB3
7449	IFITM10	HGNC:40022; A6NMD0
7450	IFNA1	HGNC:5417; P01562
7451	IFNA2	HGNC:5423; P01563
7452	IFNA4	HGNC:5425; P05014
7453	IFNA5	HGNC:5426; P01569
7454	IFNA6	HGNC:5427; P05013
7455	IFNA7	HGNC:5428; P01567
7456	IFNA8	HGNC:5429; P32881
7457	IFNA10	HGNC:5418; P01566
7458	IFNA13	HGNC:5419; P01562
7459	IFNA14	HGNC:5420; P01570
7460	IFNA16	HGNC:5421; P05015
7461	IFNA17	HGNC:5422; P01571
7462	IFNA21	HGNC:5424; P01568
7463	IFNAR1	HGNC:5432; P17181
7464	IFNAR2	HGNC:5433; P48551
7465	IFNB1	HGNC:5434; P01574
7466	IFNE	HGNC:18163; Q86WN2
7467	IFNG	HGNC:5438; P01579
7468	IFNGR1	HGNC:5439; P15260
7469	IFNGR2	HGNC:5440; P38484
7470	IFNK	HGNC:21714; Q9P0W0
7471	IFNL1	HGNC:18363; Q8IU54
7472	IFNL2	HGNC:18364; Q8IZJ0
7473	IFNL3	HGNC:18365; Q8IZI9
7474	IFNL4	HGNC:44480; K9M1U5
7475	IFNLR1	HGNC:18584; Q8IU57
7476	IFNW1	HGNC:5448; P05000
7477	IFRD1	HGNC:5456; O00458
7478	IFRD2	HGNC:5457; Q12894
7479	IFT20	HGNC:30989; Q8IY31
7480	IFT22	HGNC:21895; Q9H7X7
7481	IFT25	HGNC:25019; Q9Y547
7482	IFT27	HGNC:18626; Q9BW83
7483	IFT43	HGNC:29669; Q96FT9
7484	IFT46	HGNC:26146; Q9NQC8
7485	IFT52	HGNC:15901; Q9Y366
7486	IFT56	HGNC:21882; A0AVF1
7487	IFT57	HGNC:17367; Q9NWB7
7488	IFT70A	HGNC:25853; Q86WT1
7489	IFT70B	HGNC:26425; Q8N4P2
7490	IFT74	HGNC:21424; Q96LB3
7491	IFT80	HGNC:29262; Q9P2H3
7492	IFT81	HGNC:14313; Q8WYA0
7493	IFT88	HGNC:20606; Q13099
7494	IFT122	HGNC:13556; Q9HBG6
7495	IFT140	HGNC:29077; Q96RY7
7496	IFT172	HGNC:30391; Q9UG01
7497	IFTAP	HGNC:25142; Q86VG3
7498	IGBP1	HGNC:5461; P78318
7499	IGBP1C	HGNC:43611; A0A1W2PR95
7500	IGDCC3	HGNC:9700; Q8IVU1
7501	IGDCC4	HGNC:13770; Q8TDY8
7502	IGF1	HGNC:5464; P05019
7503	IGF1R	HGNC:5465; P08069
7504	IGF2	HGNC:5466; P01344
7505	IGF2BP1	HGNC:28866; Q9NZI8
7506	IGF2BP2	HGNC:28867; Q9Y6M1
7507	IGF2BP3	HGNC:28868; O00425
7508	IGF2R	HGNC:5467; P11717
7509	IGFALS	HGNC:5468; P35858
7510	IGFBP1	HGNC:5469; P08833
7511	IGFBP2	HGNC:5471; P18065
7512	IGFBP3	HGNC:5472; P17936
7513	IGFBP4	HGNC:5473; P22692
7514	IGFBP5	HGNC:5474; P24593
7515	IGFBP6	HGNC:5475; P24592
7516	IGFBP7	HGNC:5476; Q16270
7517	IGFBPL1	HGNC:20081; Q8WX77
7518	IGFL1	HGNC:24093; Q6UW32
7519	IGFL2	HGNC:32929; Q6UWQ7
7520	IGFL3	HGNC:32930; Q6UXB1
7521	IGFL4	HGNC:32931; Q6B9Z1
7522	IGFLR1	HGNC:23620; Q9H665
7523	IGFN1	HGNC:24607; Q86VF2
7524	IGH	HGNC:5477
7525	IGHMBP2	HGNC:5542; P38935
7526	IGIP	HGNC:33847; A6NJ69
7527	IGK	HGNC:5715
7528	IGL	HGNC:5853
7529	IGLL1	HGNC:5870; P15814
7530	IGLL5	HGNC:38476; B9A064
7531	IGLON5	HGNC:34550; A6NGN9
7532	IGSF1	HGNC:5948; Q8N6C5
7533	IGSF3	HGNC:5950; O75054
7534	IGSF5	HGNC:5952; Q9NSI5
7535	IGSF6	HGNC:5953; O95976
7536	IGSF8	HGNC:17813; Q969P0
7537	IGSF9	HGNC:18132; Q9P2J2
7538	IGSF9B	HGNC:32326; Q9UPX0
7539	IGSF10	HGNC:26384; Q6WRI0
7540	IGSF11	HGNC:16669; Q5DX21
7541	IGSF21	HGNC:28246; Q96ID5
7542	IGSF22	HGNC:26750; Q8N9C0
7543	IGSF23	HGNC:40040; A1L1A6
7544	IHH	HGNC:5956; Q14623
7545	IHO1	HGNC:27945; Q8IYA8
7546	IK	HGNC:5958; Q13123
7547	IKBIP	HGNC:26430; Q70UQ0
7548	IKBKB	HGNC:5960; O14920
7549	IKBKE	HGNC:14552; Q14164
7550	IKBKG	HGNC:5961; Q9Y6K9
7551	IKZF1	HGNC:13176; Q13422
7552	IKZF2	HGNC:13177; Q9UKS7
7553	IKZF3	HGNC:13178; Q9UKT9
7554	IKZF4	HGNC:13179; Q9H2S9
7555	IKZF5	HGNC:14283; Q9H5V7
7556	IL1A	HGNC:5991; P01583
7557	IL1B	HGNC:5992; P01584
7558	IL1F10	HGNC:15552; Q8WWZ1
7559	IL1R1	HGNC:5993; P14778
7560	IL1R2	HGNC:5994; P27930
7561	IL1RAP	HGNC:5995; Q9NPH3
7562	IL1RAPL1	HGNC:5996; Q9NZN1
7563	IL1RAPL2	HGNC:5997; Q9NP60
7564	IL1RL1	HGNC:5998; Q01638
7565	IL1RL2	HGNC:5999; Q9HB29
7566	IL1RN	HGNC:6000; P18510
7567	IL2	HGNC:6001; P60568
7568	IL2RA	HGNC:6008; P01589
7569	IL2RB	HGNC:6009; P14784
7570	IL2RG	HGNC:6010; P31785
7571	IL3	HGNC:6011; P08700
7572	IL3RA	HGNC:6012; P26951
7573	IL4	HGNC:6014; P05112
7574	IL4I1	HGNC:19094; Q96RQ9
7575	IL4R	HGNC:6015; P24394
7576	IL5	HGNC:6016; P05113
7577	IL5RA	HGNC:6017; Q01344
7578	IL6	HGNC:6018; P05231
7579	IL6R	HGNC:6019; P08887
7580	IL6ST	HGNC:6021; P40189
7581	IL7	HGNC:6023; P13232
7582	IL7R	HGNC:6024; P16871
7583	IL9	HGNC:6029; P15248
7584	IL9R	HGNC:6030; Q01113
7585	IL10	HGNC:5962; P22301
7586	IL10RA	HGNC:5964; Q13651
7587	IL10RB	HGNC:5965; Q08334
7588	IL11	HGNC:5966; P20809
7589	IL11RA	HGNC:5967; Q14626
7590	IL12A	HGNC:5969; P29459
7591	IL12B	HGNC:5970; P29460
7592	IL12RB1	HGNC:5971; P42701
7593	IL12RB2	HGNC:5972; Q99665
7594	IL13	HGNC:5973; P35225
7595	IL13RA1	HGNC:5974; P78552
7596	IL13RA2	HGNC:5975; Q14627
7597	IL15	HGNC:5977; P40933
7598	IL15RA	HGNC:5978; Q13261
7599	IL16	HGNC:5980; Q14005
7600	IL17A	HGNC:5981; Q16552
7601	IL17B	HGNC:5982; Q9UHF5
7602	IL17C	HGNC:5983; Q9P0M4
7603	IL17D	HGNC:5984; Q8TAD2
7604	IL17F	HGNC:16404; Q96PD4
7605	IL17RA	HGNC:5985; Q96F46
7606	IL17RB	HGNC:18015; Q9NRM6
7607	IL17RC	HGNC:18358; Q8NAC3
7608	IL17RD	HGNC:17616; Q8NFM7
7609	IL17RE	HGNC:18439; Q8NFR9
7610	IL17REL	HGNC:33808; Q6ZVW7
7611	IL18	HGNC:5986; Q14116
7612	IL18BP	HGNC:5987; O95998
7613	IL18R1	HGNC:5988; Q13478
7614	IL18RAP	HGNC:5989; O95256
7615	IL19	HGNC:5990; Q9UHD0
7616	IL20	HGNC:6002; Q9NYY1
7617	IL20RA	HGNC:6003; Q9UHF4
7618	IL20RB	HGNC:6004; Q6UXL0
7619	IL21	HGNC:6005; Q9HBE4
7620	IL21R	HGNC:6006; Q9HBE5
7621	IL22	HGNC:14900; Q9GZX6
7622	IL22RA1	HGNC:13700; Q8N6P7
7623	IL22RA2	HGNC:14901; Q969J5
7624	IL23A	HGNC:15488; Q9NPF7
7625	IL23R	HGNC:19100; Q5VWK5
7626	IL24	HGNC:11346; Q13007
7627	IL25	HGNC:13765; Q9H293
7628	IL26	HGNC:17119; Q9NPH9
7629	IL27	HGNC:19157; Q8NEV9
7630	IL27RA	HGNC:17290; Q6UWB1
7631	IL31	HGNC:19372; Q6EBC2
7632	IL31RA	HGNC:18969; Q8NI17
7633	IL32	HGNC:16830; P24001
7634	IL33	HGNC:16028; O95760
7635	IL34	HGNC:28529; Q6ZMJ4
7636	IL36A	HGNC:15562; Q9UHA7
7637	IL36B	HGNC:15564; Q9NZH7
7638	IL36G	HGNC:15741; Q9NZH8
7639	IL36RN	HGNC:15561; Q9UBH0
7640	IL37	HGNC:15563; Q9NZH6
7641	ILDR1	HGNC:28741; Q86SU0
7642	ILDR2	HGNC:18131; Q71H61
7643	ILF2	HGNC:6037; Q12905
7644	ILF3	HGNC:6038; Q12906
7645	ILK	HGNC:6040; Q13418
7646	ILKAP	HGNC:15566; Q9H0C8
7647	ILRUN	HGNC:21215; Q9H6K1
7648	IMMP1L	HGNC:26317; Q96LU5
7649	IMMP2L	HGNC:14598; Q96T52
7650	IMMT	HGNC:6047; Q16891
7651	IMP3	HGNC:14497; Q9NV31
7652	IMP4	HGNC:30856; Q96G21
7653	IMPA1	HGNC:6050; P29218
7654	IMPA2	HGNC:6051; O14732
7655	IMPACT	HGNC:20387; Q9P2X3
7656	IMPDH1	HGNC:6052; P20839
7657	IMPDH2	HGNC:6053; P12268
7658	IMPG1	HGNC:6055; Q17R60
7659	IMPG2	HGNC:18362; Q9BZV3
7660	INA	HGNC:6057; Q16352
7661	INAFM1	HGNC:27406; C9JVW0
7662	INAFM2	HGNC:35165; P0DMQ5
7663	INAVA	HGNC:25599; Q3KP66
7664	INCA1	HGNC:32224; Q0VD86
7665	INCENP	HGNC:6058; Q9NQS7
7666	INF2	HGNC:23791; Q27J81
7667	ING1	HGNC:6062; Q9UK53
7668	ING2	HGNC:6063; Q9H160
7669	ING3	HGNC:14587; Q9NXR8
7670	ING4	HGNC:19423; Q9UNL4
7671	ING5	HGNC:19421; Q8WYH8
7672	INHA	HGNC:6065; P05111
7673	INHBA	HGNC:6066; P08476
7674	INHBB	HGNC:6067; P09529
7675	INHBC	HGNC:6068; P55103
7676	INHBE	HGNC:24029; P58166
7677	INIP	HGNC:24994; Q9NRY2
7678	INKA1	HGNC:32480; Q96EL1
7679	INKA2	HGNC:28045; Q9NTI7
7680	INMT	HGNC:6069; O95050
7681	INO80	HGNC:26956; Q9ULG1
7682	INO80B	HGNC:13324; Q9C086
7683	INO80C	HGNC:26994; Q6PI98
7684	INO80D	HGNC:25997; Q53TQ3
7685	INO80E	HGNC:26905; Q8NBZ0
7686	INPP1	HGNC:6071; P49441
7687	INPP4A	HGNC:6074; Q96PE3
7688	INPP4B	HGNC:6075; O15327
7689	INPP5A	HGNC:6076; Q14642
7690	INPP5B	HGNC:6077; P32019
7691	INPP5D	HGNC:6079; Q92835
7692	INPP5E	HGNC:21474; Q9NRR6
7693	INPP5F	HGNC:17054; Q9Y2H2
7694	INPP5J	HGNC:8956; Q15735
7695	INPP5K	HGNC:33882; Q9BT40
7696	INPPL1	HGNC:6080; O15357
7697	INS	HGNC:6081; P01308
7698	INSC	HGNC:33116; Q1MX18
7699	INSIG1	HGNC:6083; O15503
7700	INSIG2	HGNC:20452; Q9Y5U4
7701	INSL3	HGNC:6086; P51460
7702	INSL4	HGNC:6087; Q14641
7703	INSL5	HGNC:6088; Q9Y5Q6
7704	INSL6	HGNC:6089; Q9Y581
7705	INSM1	HGNC:6090; Q01101
7706	INSM2	HGNC:17539; Q96T92
7707	INSR	HGNC:6091; P06213
7708	INSRR	HGNC:6093; P14616
7709	INSYN1	HGNC:33753; Q2T9L4
7710	INSYN2A	HGNC:33859; Q6ZSG2
7711	INSYN2B	HGNC:37271; A6NMK8
7712	INTS1	HGNC:24555; Q8N201
7713	INTS2	HGNC:29241; Q9H0H0
7714	INTS3	HGNC:26153; Q68E01
7715	INTS4	HGNC:25048; Q96HW7
7716	INTS5	HGNC:29352; Q6P9B9
7717	INTS6	HGNC:14879; Q9UL03
7718	INTS6L	HGNC:27334; Q5JSJ4
7719	INTS7	HGNC:24484; Q9NVH2
7720	INTS8	HGNC:26048; Q75QN2
7721	INTS9	HGNC:25592; Q9NV88
7722	INTS10	HGNC:25548; Q9NVR2
7723	INTS11	HGNC:26052; Q5TA45
7724	INTS12	HGNC:25067; Q96CB8
7725	INTS13	HGNC:20174; Q9NVM9
7726	INTS14	HGNC:25372; Q96SY0
7727	INTS15	HGNC:21702; Q96N11
7728	INTU	HGNC:29239; Q9ULD6
7729	INVS	HGNC:17870; Q9Y283
7730	IP6K1	HGNC:18360; Q92551
7731	IP6K2	HGNC:17313; Q9UHH9
7732	IP6K3	HGNC:17269; Q96PC2
7733	IPCEF1	HGNC:21204; Q8WWN9
7734	IPMK	HGNC:20739; Q8NFU5
7735	IPO4	HGNC:19426; Q8TEX9
7736	IPO5	HGNC:6402; O00410
7737	IPO7	HGNC:9852; O95373
7738	IPO8	HGNC:9853; O15397
7739	IPO9	HGNC:19425; Q96P70
7740	IPO11	HGNC:20628; Q9UI26
7741	IPO13	HGNC:16853; O94829
7742	IPP	HGNC:6108; Q9Y573
7743	IPPK	HGNC:14645; Q9H8X2
7744	IQANK1	HGNC:49576; A8MXQ7
7745	IQCB1	HGNC:28949; Q15051
7746	IQCC	HGNC:25545; Q4KMZ1
7747	IQCE	HGNC:29171; Q6IPM2
7748	IQCF1	HGNC:28607; Q8N6M8
7749	IQCF2	HGNC:31815; Q8IXL9
7750	IQCF3	HGNC:31816; P0C7M6
7751	IQCF5	HGNC:35159; A8MTL0
7752	IQCF6	HGNC:35158; A8MYZ5
7753	IQCH	HGNC:25721; Q86VS3
7754	IQCJ	HGNC:32406; Q1A5X6
7755	IQCK	HGNC:28556; Q8N0W5
7756	IQCM	HGNC:53443; A0A1B0GVH7
7757	IQCN	HGNC:29350; Q9H0B3
7758	IQGAP1	HGNC:6110; P46940
7759	IQGAP2	HGNC:6111; Q13576
7760	IQGAP3	HGNC:20669; Q86VI3
7761	IQSEC1	HGNC:29112; Q6DN90
7762	IQSEC2	HGNC:29059; Q5JU85
7763	IQSEC3	HGNC:29193; Q9UPP2
7764	IQUB	HGNC:21995; Q8NA54
7765	IRAG1	HGNC:7237; Q9Y6F6
7766	IRAG2	HGNC:6690; Q12912
7767	IRAK1	HGNC:6112; P51617
7768	IRAK1BP1	HGNC:17368; Q5VVH5
7769	IRAK2	HGNC:6113; O43187
7770	IRAK3	HGNC:17020; Q9Y616
7771	IRAK4	HGNC:17967; Q9NWZ3
7772	IREB2	HGNC:6115; P48200
7773	IRF1	HGNC:6116; P10914
7774	IRF2	HGNC:6117; P14316
7775	IRF2BP1	HGNC:21728; Q8IU81
7776	IRF2BP2	HGNC:21729; Q7Z5L9
7777	IRF2BPL	HGNC:14282; Q9H1B7
7778	IRF3	HGNC:6118; Q14653
7779	IRF4	HGNC:6119; Q15306
7780	IRF5	HGNC:6120; Q13568
7781	IRF6	HGNC:6121; O14896
7782	IRF7	HGNC:6122; Q92985
7783	IRF8	HGNC:5358; Q02556
7784	IRF9	HGNC:6131; Q00978
7785	IRGC	HGNC:28835; Q6NXR0
7786	IRGM	HGNC:29597; A1A4Y4
7787	IRGQ	HGNC:24868; Q8WZA9
7788	IRS1	HGNC:6125; P35568
7789	IRS2	HGNC:6126; Q9Y4H2
7790	IRS4	HGNC:6128; O14654
7791	IRX1	HGNC:14358; P78414
7792	IRX2	HGNC:14359; Q9BZI1
7793	IRX3	HGNC:14360; P78415
7794	IRX4	HGNC:6129; P78413
7795	IRX5	HGNC:14361; P78411
7796	IRX6	HGNC:14675; P78412
7797	ISCA1	HGNC:28660; Q9BUE6
7798	ISCA2	HGNC:19857; Q86U28
7799	ISCU	HGNC:29882; Q9H1K1
7800	ISG15	HGNC:4053; P05161
7801	ISG20	HGNC:6130; Q96AZ6
7802	ISG20L2	HGNC:25745; Q9H9L3
7803	ISL1	HGNC:6132; P61371
7804	ISL2	HGNC:18524; Q96A47
7805	ISLR	HGNC:6133; O14498
7806	ISLR2	HGNC:29286; Q6UXK2
7807	ISM1	HGNC:16213; B1AKI9
7808	ISM2	HGNC:23176; Q6H9L7
7809	ISOC1	HGNC:24254; Q96CN7
7810	ISOC2	HGNC:26278; Q96AB3
7811	IST1	HGNC:28977; P53990
7812	ISX	HGNC:28084; Q2M1V0
7813	ISY1	HGNC:29201; Q9ULR0
7814	ISYNA1	HGNC:29821; Q9NPH2
7815	ITCH	HGNC:13890; Q96J02
7816	ITFG1	HGNC:30697; Q8TB96
7817	ITFG2	HGNC:30879; Q969R8
7818	ITGA1	HGNC:6134; P56199
7819	ITGA2	HGNC:6137; P17301
7820	ITGA2B	HGNC:6138; P08514
7821	ITGA3	HGNC:6139; P26006
7822	ITGA4	HGNC:6140; P13612
7823	ITGA5	HGNC:6141; P08648
7824	ITGA6	HGNC:6142; P23229
7825	ITGA7	HGNC:6143; Q13683
7826	ITGA8	HGNC:6144; P53708
7827	ITGA9	HGNC:6145; Q13797
7828	ITGA10	HGNC:6135; O75578
7829	ITGA11	HGNC:6136; Q9UKX5
7830	ITGAD	HGNC:6146; Q13349
7831	ITGAE	HGNC:6147; P38570
7832	ITGAL	HGNC:6148; P20701
7833	ITGAM	HGNC:6149; P11215
7834	ITGAV	HGNC:6150; P06756
7835	ITGAX	HGNC:6152; P20702
7836	ITGB1	HGNC:6153; P05556
7837	ITGB1BP1	HGNC:23927; O14713
7838	ITGB1BP2	HGNC:6154; Q9UKP3
7839	ITGB2	HGNC:6155; P05107
7840	ITGB3	HGNC:6156; P05106
7841	ITGB3BP	HGNC:6157; Q13352
7842	ITGB4	HGNC:6158; P16144
7843	ITGB5	HGNC:6160; P18084
7844	ITGB6	HGNC:6161; P18564
7845	ITGB7	HGNC:6162; P26010
7846	ITGB8	HGNC:6163; P26012
7847	ITGBL1	HGNC:6164; O95965
7848	ITIH1	HGNC:6166; P19827
7849	ITIH2	HGNC:6167; P19823
7850	ITIH3	HGNC:6168; Q06033
7851	ITIH4	HGNC:6169; Q14624
7852	ITIH5	HGNC:21449; Q86UX2
7853	ITIH6	HGNC:28907; Q6UXX5
7854	ITK	HGNC:6171; Q08881
7855	ITLN1	HGNC:18259; Q8WWA0
7856	ITLN2	HGNC:20599; Q8WWU7
7857	ITM2A	HGNC:6173; O43736
7858	ITM2B	HGNC:6174; Q9Y287
7859	ITM2C	HGNC:6175; Q9NQX7
7860	ITPA	HGNC:6176; Q9BY32
7861	ITPK1	HGNC:6177; Q13572
7862	ITPKA	HGNC:6178; P23677
7863	ITPKB	HGNC:6179; P27987
7864	ITPKC	HGNC:14897; Q96DU7
7865	ITPR1	HGNC:6180; Q14643
7866	ITPR2	HGNC:6181; Q14571
7867	ITPR3	HGNC:6182; Q14573
7868	ITPRID1	HGNC:27363; Q6ZRS4
7869	ITPRID2	HGNC:11319; P28290
7870	ITPRIP	HGNC:29370; Q8IWB1
7871	ITPRIPL1	HGNC:29371; Q6GPH6
7872	ITPRIPL2	HGNC:27257; Q3MIP1
7873	ITSN1	HGNC:6183; Q15811
7874	ITSN2	HGNC:6184; Q9NZM3
7875	IVD	HGNC:6186; P26440
7876	IVL	HGNC:6187; P07476
7877	IVNS1ABP	HGNC:16951; Q9Y6Y0
7878	IWS1	HGNC:25467; Q96ST2
7879	IYD	HGNC:21071; Q6PHW0
7880	IZUMO1	HGNC:28539; Q8IYV9
7881	IZUMO1R	HGNC:32565; A6ND01
7882	IZUMO2	HGNC:28518; Q6UXV1
7883	IZUMO3	HGNC:31421; Q5VZ72
7884	IZUMO4	HGNC:26950; Q1ZYL8
7885	JADE1	HGNC:30027; Q6IE81
7886	JADE2	HGNC:22984; Q9NQC1
7887	JADE3	HGNC:22982; Q92613
7888	JAG1	HGNC:6188; P78504
7889	JAG2	HGNC:6189; Q9Y219
7890	JAGN1	HGNC:26926; Q8N5M9
7891	JAK1	HGNC:6190; P23458
7892	JAK2	HGNC:6192; O60674
7893	JAK3	HGNC:6193; P52333
7894	JAKMIP1	HGNC:26460; Q96N16
7895	JAKMIP2	HGNC:29067; Q96AA8
7896	JAKMIP3	HGNC:23523; Q5VZ66
7897	JAM2	HGNC:14686; P57087
7898	JAM3	HGNC:15532; Q9BX67
7899	JAML	HGNC:19084; Q86YT9
7900	JARID2	HGNC:6196; Q92833
7901	JAZF1	HGNC:28917; Q86VZ6
7902	JCAD	HGNC:29283; Q9P266
7903	JCHAIN	HGNC:5713; P01591
7904	JDP2	HGNC:17546; Q8WYK2
7905	JHY	HGNC:26288; Q6NUN7
7906	JKAMP	HGNC:20184; Q9P055
7907	JMJD1C	HGNC:12313; Q15652
7908	JMJD4	HGNC:25724; Q9H9V9
7909	JMJD6	HGNC:19355; Q6NYC1
7910	JMJD7	HGNC:34397; P0C870
7911	JMJD8	HGNC:14148; Q96S16
7912	JMY	HGNC:28916; Q8N9B5
7913	JOSD1	HGNC:28953; Q15040
7914	JOSD2	HGNC:28853; Q8TAC2
7915	JPH1	HGNC:14201; Q9HDC5
7916	JPH2	HGNC:14202; Q9BR39
7917	JPH3	HGNC:14203; Q8WXH2
7918	JPH4	HGNC:20156; Q96JJ6
7919	JPT1	HGNC:14569; Q9UK76
7920	JPT2	HGNC:14137; Q9H910
7921	JRK	HGNC:6199; O75564
7922	JRKL	HGNC:6200; Q9Y4A0
7923	JSRP1	HGNC:24963; Q96MG2
7924	JTB	HGNC:6201; O76095
7925	JUN	HGNC:6204; P05412
7926	JUNB	HGNC:6205; P17275
7927	JUND	HGNC:6206; P17535
7928	JUP	HGNC:6207; P14923
7929	KALRN	HGNC:4814; O60229
7930	KANK1	HGNC:19309; Q14678
7931	KANK2	HGNC:29300; Q63ZY3
7932	KANK3	HGNC:24796; Q6NY19
7933	KANK4	HGNC:27263; Q5T7N3
7934	KANSL1	HGNC:24565; Q7Z3B3
7935	KANSL1L	HGNC:26310; A0AUZ9
7936	KANSL2	HGNC:26024; Q9H9L4
7937	KANSL3	HGNC:25473; Q9P2N6
7938	KANTR	HGNC:49510; A0A1W2PQU2
7939	KARS1	HGNC:6215; Q15046
7940	KASH5	HGNC:26520; Q8N6L0
7941	KAT2A	HGNC:4201; Q92830
7942	KAT2B	HGNC:8638; Q92831
7943	KAT5	HGNC:5275; Q92993
7944	KAT6A	HGNC:13013; Q92794
7945	KAT6B	HGNC:17582; Q8WYB5
7946	KAT7	HGNC:17016; O95251
7947	KAT8	HGNC:17933; Q9H7Z6
7948	KAT14	HGNC:15904; Q9H8E8
7949	KATNA1	HGNC:6216; O75449
7950	KATNAL1	HGNC:28361; Q9BW62
7951	KATNAL2	HGNC:25387; Q8IYT4
7952	KATNB1	HGNC:6217; Q9BVA0
7953	KATNBL1	HGNC:26199; Q9H079
7954	KATNIP	HGNC:29068; O60303
7955	KAZALD1	HGNC:25460; Q96I82
7956	KAZN	HGNC:29173; Q674X7
7957	KBTBD2	HGNC:21751; Q8IY47
7958	KBTBD3	HGNC:22934; Q8NAB2
7959	KBTBD4	HGNC:23761; Q9NVX7
7960	KBTBD6	HGNC:25340; Q86V97
7961	KBTBD7	HGNC:25266; Q8WVZ9
7962	KBTBD8	HGNC:30691; Q8NFY9
7963	KBTBD11	HGNC:29104; O94819
7964	KBTBD12	HGNC:25731; Q3ZCT8
7965	KBTBD13	HGNC:37227; C9JR72
7966	KCMF1	HGNC:20589; Q9P0J7
7967	KCNA1	HGNC:6218; Q09470
7968	KCNA2	HGNC:6220; P16389
7969	KCNA3	HGNC:6221; P22001
7970	KCNA4	HGNC:6222; P22459
7971	KCNA5	HGNC:6224; P22460
7972	KCNA6	HGNC:6225; P17658
7973	KCNA7	HGNC:6226; Q96RP8
7974	KCNA10	HGNC:6219; Q16322
7975	KCNAB1	HGNC:6228; Q14722
7976	KCNAB2	HGNC:6229; Q13303
7977	KCNAB3	HGNC:6230; O43448
7978	KCNB1	HGNC:6231; Q14721
7979	KCNB2	HGNC:6232; Q92953
7980	KCNC1	HGNC:6233; P48547
7981	KCNC2	HGNC:6234; Q96PR1
7982	KCNC3	HGNC:6235; Q14003
7983	KCNC4	HGNC:6236; Q03721
7984	KCND1	HGNC:6237; Q9NSA2
7985	KCND2	HGNC:6238; Q9NZV8
7986	KCND3	HGNC:6239; Q9UK17
7987	KCNE1	HGNC:6240; P15382
7988	KCNE2	HGNC:6242; Q9Y6J6
7989	KCNE3	HGNC:6243; Q9Y6H6
7990	KCNE4	HGNC:6244; Q8WWG9
7991	KCNE5	HGNC:6241; Q9UJ90
7992	KCNF1	HGNC:6246; Q9H3M0
7993	KCNG1	HGNC:6248; Q9UIX4
7994	KCNG2	HGNC:6249; Q9UJ96
7995	KCNG3	HGNC:18306; Q8TAE7
7996	KCNG4	HGNC:19697; Q8TDN1
7997	KCNH1	HGNC:6250; O95259
7998	KCNH2	HGNC:6251; Q12809
7999	KCNH3	HGNC:6252; Q9ULD8
8000	KCNH4	HGNC:6253; Q9UQ05
8001	KCNH5	HGNC:6254; Q8NCM2
8002	KCNH6	HGNC:18862; Q9H252
8003	KCNH7	HGNC:18863; Q9NS40
8004	KCNH8	HGNC:18864; Q96L42
8005	KCNIP1	HGNC:15521; Q9NZI2
8006	KCNIP2	HGNC:15522; Q9NS61
8007	KCNIP3	HGNC:15523; Q9Y2W7
8008	KCNIP4	HGNC:30083; Q6PIL6
8009	KCNJ1	HGNC:6255; P48048
8010	KCNJ2	HGNC:6263; P63252
8011	KCNJ3	HGNC:6264; P48549
8012	KCNJ4	HGNC:6265; P48050
8013	KCNJ5	HGNC:6266; P48544
8014	KCNJ6	HGNC:6267; P48051
8015	KCNJ8	HGNC:6269; Q15842
8016	KCNJ9	HGNC:6270; Q92806
8017	KCNJ10	HGNC:6256; P78508
8018	KCNJ11	HGNC:6257; Q14654
8019	KCNJ12	HGNC:6258; Q14500
8020	KCNJ13	HGNC:6259; O60928
8021	KCNJ14	HGNC:6260; Q9UNX9
8022	KCNJ15	HGNC:6261; Q99712
8023	KCNJ16	HGNC:6262; Q9NPI9
8024	KCNJ18	HGNC:39080; B7U540
8025	KCNK1	HGNC:6272; O00180
8026	KCNK2	HGNC:6277; O95069
8027	KCNK3	HGNC:6278; O14649
8028	KCNK4	HGNC:6279; Q9NYG8
8029	KCNK5	HGNC:6280; O95279
8030	KCNK6	HGNC:6281; Q9Y257
8031	KCNK7	HGNC:6282; Q9Y2U2
8032	KCNK9	HGNC:6283; Q9NPC2
8033	KCNK10	HGNC:6273; P57789
8034	KCNK12	HGNC:6274; Q9HB15
8035	KCNK13	HGNC:6275; Q9HB14
8036	KCNK15	HGNC:13814; Q9H427
8037	KCNK16	HGNC:14464; Q96T55
8038	KCNK17	HGNC:14465; Q96T54
8039	KCNK18	HGNC:19439; Q7Z418
8040	KCNMA1	HGNC:6284; Q12791
8041	KCNMB1	HGNC:6285; Q16558
8042	KCNMB2	HGNC:6286; Q9Y691
8043	KCNMB3	HGNC:6287; Q9NPA1
8044	KCNMB4	HGNC:6289; Q86W47
8045	KCNN1	HGNC:6290; Q92952
8046	KCNN2	HGNC:6291; Q9H2S1
8047	KCNN3	HGNC:6292; Q9UGI6
8048	KCNN4	HGNC:6293; O15554
8049	KCNQ1	HGNC:6294; P51787
8050	KCNQ2	HGNC:6296; O43526
8051	KCNQ3	HGNC:6297; O43525
8052	KCNQ4	HGNC:6298; P56696
8053	KCNQ5	HGNC:6299; Q9NR82
8054	KCNRG	HGNC:18893; Q8N5I3
8055	KCNS1	HGNC:6300; Q96KK3
8056	KCNS2	HGNC:6301; Q9ULS6
8057	KCNS3	HGNC:6302; Q9BQ31
8058	KCNT1	HGNC:18865; Q5JUK3
8059	KCNT2	HGNC:18866; Q6UVM3
8060	KCNU1	HGNC:18867; A8MYU2
8061	KCNV1	HGNC:18861; Q6PIU1
8062	KCNV2	HGNC:19698; Q8TDN2
8063	KCP	HGNC:17585; Q6ZWJ8
8064	KCTD1	HGNC:18249; Q719H9
8065	KCTD2	HGNC:21294; Q14681
8066	KCTD3	HGNC:21305; Q9Y597
8067	KCTD4	HGNC:23227; Q8WVF5
8068	KCTD5	HGNC:21423; Q9NXV2
8069	KCTD6	HGNC:22235; Q8NC69
8070	KCTD7	HGNC:21957; Q96MP8
8071	KCTD8	HGNC:22394; Q6ZWB6
8072	KCTD9	HGNC:22401; Q7L273
8073	KCTD10	HGNC:23236; Q9H3F6
8074	KCTD11	HGNC:21302; Q693B1
8075	KCTD12	HGNC:14678; Q96CX2
8076	KCTD13	HGNC:22234; Q8WZ19
8077	KCTD14	HGNC:23295; Q9BQ13
8078	KCTD15	HGNC:23297; Q96SI1
8079	KCTD16	HGNC:29244; Q68DU8
8080	KCTD17	HGNC:25705; Q8N5Z5
8081	KCTD18	HGNC:26446; Q6PI47
8082	KCTD19	HGNC:24753; Q17RG1
8083	KCTD20	HGNC:21052; Q7Z5Y7
8084	KCTD21	HGNC:27452; Q4G0X4
8085	KDELR1	HGNC:6304; P24390
8086	KDELR2	HGNC:6305; P33947
8087	KDELR3	HGNC:6306; O43731
8088	KDF1	HGNC:26624; Q8NAX2
8089	KDM1A	HGNC:29079; O60341
8090	KDM1B	HGNC:21577; Q8NB78
8091	KDM2A	HGNC:13606; Q9Y2K7
8092	KDM2B	HGNC:13610; Q8NHM5
8093	KDM3A	HGNC:20815; Q9Y4C1
8094	KDM3B	HGNC:1337; Q7LBC6
8095	KDM4A	HGNC:22978; O75164
8096	KDM4B	HGNC:29136; O94953
8097	KDM4C	HGNC:17071; Q9H3R0
8098	KDM4D	HGNC:25498; Q6B0I6
8099	KDM4E	HGNC:37098; B2RXH2
8100	KDM4F	HGNC:52413; A0A1W2PPD8
8101	KDM5A	HGNC:9886; P29375
8102	KDM5B	HGNC:18039; Q9UGL1
8103	KDM5C	HGNC:11114; P41229
8104	KDM5D	HGNC:11115; Q9BY66
8105	KDM6A	HGNC:12637; O15550
8106	KDM6B	HGNC:29012; O15054
8107	KDM7A	HGNC:22224; Q6ZMT4
8108	KDM8	HGNC:25840; Q8N371
8109	KDR	HGNC:6307; P35968
8110	KDSR	HGNC:4021; Q06136
8111	KEAP1	HGNC:23177; Q14145
8112	KEL	HGNC:6308; P23276
8113	KERA	HGNC:6309; O60938
8114	KGD4	HGNC:16631; P82909
8115	KHDC1	HGNC:21366; Q4VXA5
8116	KHDC1L	HGNC:37274; Q5JSQ8
8117	KHDC3L	HGNC:33699; Q587J8
8118	KHDC4	HGNC:29145; Q7Z7F0
8119	KHDRBS1	HGNC:18116; Q07666
8120	KHDRBS2	HGNC:18114; Q5VWX1
8121	KHDRBS3	HGNC:18117; O75525
8122	KHK	HGNC:6315; P50053
8123	KHNYN	HGNC:20166; O15037
8124	KHSRP	HGNC:6316; Q92945
8125	KIAA0040	HGNC:28950; Q15053
8126	KIAA0232	HGNC:28992; Q92628
8127	KIAA0319	HGNC:21580; Q5VV43
8128	KIAA0319L	HGNC:30071; Q8IZA0
8129	KIAA0408	HGNC:21636; Q6ZU52
8130	KIAA0513	HGNC:29058; O60268
8131	KIAA0586	HGNC:19960; Q9BVV6
8132	KIAA0753	HGNC:29110; Q2KHM9
8133	KIAA0825	HGNC:28532; Q8IV33
8134	KIAA0930	HGNC:1314; Q6ICG6
8135	KIAA1143	HGNC:29198; Q96AT1
8136	KIAA1191	HGNC:29209; Q96A73
8137	KIAA1210	HGNC:29218; Q9ULL0
8138	KIAA1217	HGNC:25428; Q5T5P2
8139	KIAA1328	HGNC:29248; Q86T90
8140	KIAA1549	HGNC:22219; Q9HCM3
8141	KIAA1549L	HGNC:24836; Q6ZVL6
8142	KIAA1586	HGNC:21360; Q9HCI6
8143	KIAA1614	HGNC:29327; Q5VZ46
8144	KIAA1671	HGNC:29345; Q9BY89
8145	KIAA1755	HGNC:29372; Q5JYT7
8146	KIAA1958	HGNC:23427; Q8N8K9
8147	KIAA2012	HGNC:51250; Q0VF49
8148	KIAA2013	HGNC:28513; Q8IYS2
8149	KICS2	HGNC:26517; Q96MD2
8150	KIDINS220	HGNC:29508; Q9ULH0
8151	KIF1A	HGNC:888; Q12756
8152	KIF1B	HGNC:16636; O60333
8153	KIF1C	HGNC:6317; O43896
8154	KIF2A	HGNC:6318; O00139
8155	KIF2B	HGNC:29443; Q8N4N8
8156	KIF2C	HGNC:6393; Q99661
8157	KIF3A	HGNC:6319; Q9Y496
8158	KIF3B	HGNC:6320; O15066
8159	KIF3C	HGNC:6321; O14782
8160	KIF4A	HGNC:13339; O95239
8161	KIF4B	HGNC:6322; Q2VIQ3
8162	KIF5A	HGNC:6323; Q12840
8163	KIF5B	HGNC:6324; P33176
8164	KIF5C	HGNC:6325; O60282
8165	KIF6	HGNC:21202; Q6ZMV9
8166	KIF7	HGNC:30497; Q2M1P5
8167	KIF9	HGNC:16666; Q9HAQ2
8168	KIF11	HGNC:6388; P52732
8169	KIF12	HGNC:21495; Q96FN5
8170	KIF13A	HGNC:14566; Q9H1H9
8171	KIF13B	HGNC:14405; Q9NQT8
8172	KIF14	HGNC:19181; Q15058
8173	KIF15	HGNC:17273; Q9NS87
8174	KIF16B	HGNC:15869; Q96L93
8175	KIF17	HGNC:19167; Q9P2E2
8176	KIF18A	HGNC:29441; Q8NI77
8177	KIF18B	HGNC:27102; Q86Y91
8178	KIF19	HGNC:26735; Q2TAC6
8179	KIF20A	HGNC:9787; O95235
8180	KIF20B	HGNC:7212; Q96Q89
8181	KIF21A	HGNC:19349; Q7Z4S6
8182	KIF21B	HGNC:29442; O75037
8183	KIF22	HGNC:6391; Q14807
8184	KIF23	HGNC:6392; Q02241
8185	KIF24	HGNC:19916; Q5T7B8
8186	KIF25	HGNC:6390; Q9UIL4
8187	KIF26A	HGNC:20226; Q9ULI4
8188	KIF26B	HGNC:25484; Q2KJY2
8189	KIF27	HGNC:18632; Q86VH2
8190	KIFAP3	HGNC:17060; Q92845
8191	KIFBP	HGNC:23419; Q96EK5
8192	KIFC1	HGNC:6389; Q9BW19
8193	KIFC2	HGNC:29530; Q96AC6
8194	KIFC3	HGNC:6326; Q9BVG8
8195	KIN	HGNC:6327; O60870
8196	KIR2DL1	HGNC:6329; P43626
8197	KIR2DL3	HGNC:6331; P43628
8198	KIR2DL4	HGNC:6332; Q99706
8199	KIR2DS4	HGNC:6336; P43632
8200	KIR3DL1	HGNC:6338; P43629
8201	KIR3DL2	HGNC:6339; P43630
8202	KIR3DL3	HGNC:16312; Q8N743
8203	KIRREL1	HGNC:15734; Q96J84
8204	KIRREL2	HGNC:18816; Q6UWL6
8205	KIRREL3	HGNC:23204; Q8IZU9
8206	KISS1	HGNC:6341; Q15726
8207	KISS1R	HGNC:4510; Q969F8
8208	KIT	HGNC:6342; P10721
8209	KITLG	HGNC:6343; P21583
8210	KIZ	HGNC:15865; Q2M2Z5
8211	KL	HGNC:6344; Q9UEF7
8212	KLB	HGNC:15527; Q86Z14
8213	KLC1	HGNC:6387; Q07866
8214	KLC2	HGNC:20716; Q9H0B6
8215	KLC3	HGNC:20717; Q6P597
8216	KLC4	HGNC:21624; Q9NSK0
8217	KLF1	HGNC:6345; Q13351
8218	KLF2	HGNC:6347; Q9Y5W3
8219	KLF3	HGNC:16516; P57682
8220	KLF4	HGNC:6348; O43474
8221	KLF5	HGNC:6349; Q13887
8222	KLF6	HGNC:2235; Q99612
8223	KLF7	HGNC:6350; O75840
8224	KLF8	HGNC:6351; O95600
8225	KLF9	HGNC:1123; Q13886
8226	KLF10	HGNC:11810; Q13118
8227	KLF11	HGNC:11811; O14901
8228	KLF12	HGNC:6346; Q9Y4X4
8229	KLF13	HGNC:13672; Q9Y2Y9
8230	KLF14	HGNC:23025; Q8TD94
8231	KLF15	HGNC:14536; Q9UIH9
8232	KLF16	HGNC:16857; Q9BXK1
8233	KLF17	HGNC:18830; Q5JT82
8234	KLF18	HGNC:51793; A0A0U1RQI7
8235	KLHDC1	HGNC:19836; Q8N7A1
8236	KLHDC2	HGNC:20231; Q9Y2U9
8237	KLHDC3	HGNC:20704; Q9BQ90
8238	KLHDC4	HGNC:25272; Q8TBB5
8239	KLHDC7A	HGNC:26791; Q5VTJ3
8240	KLHDC7B	HGNC:25145; Q96G42
8241	KLHDC8A	HGNC:25573; Q8IYD2
8242	KLHDC8B	HGNC:28557; Q8IXV7
8243	KLHDC9	HGNC:28489; Q8NEP7
8244	KLHDC10	HGNC:22194; Q6PID8
8245	KLHL1	HGNC:6352; Q9NR64
8246	KLHL2	HGNC:6353; O95198
8247	KLHL3	HGNC:6354; Q9UH77
8248	KLHL4	HGNC:6355; Q9C0H6
8249	KLHL5	HGNC:6356; Q96PQ7
8250	KLHL6	HGNC:18653; Q8WZ60
8251	KLHL7	HGNC:15646; Q8IXQ5
8252	KLHL8	HGNC:18644; Q9P2G9
8253	KLHL9	HGNC:18732; Q9P2J3
8254	KLHL10	HGNC:18829; Q6JEL2
8255	KLHL11	HGNC:19008; Q9NVR0
8256	KLHL12	HGNC:19360; Q53G59
8257	KLHL13	HGNC:22931; Q9P2N7
8258	KLHL14	HGNC:29266; Q9P2G3
8259	KLHL15	HGNC:29347; Q96M94
8260	KLHL17	HGNC:24023; Q6TDP4
8261	KLHL18	HGNC:29120; O94889
8262	KLHL20	HGNC:25056; Q9Y2M5
8263	KLHL21	HGNC:29041; Q9UJP4
8264	KLHL22	HGNC:25888; Q53GT1
8265	KLHL23	HGNC:27506; Q8NBE8
8266	KLHL24	HGNC:25947; Q6TFL4
8267	KLHL25	HGNC:25732; Q9H0H3
8268	KLHL26	HGNC:25623; Q53HC5
8269	KLHL28	HGNC:19741; Q9NXS3
8270	KLHL29	HGNC:29404; Q96CT2
8271	KLHL30	HGNC:24770; Q0D2K2
8272	KLHL31	HGNC:21353; Q9H511
8273	KLHL32	HGNC:21221; Q96NJ5
8274	KLHL33	HGNC:31952; A6NCF5
8275	KLHL34	HGNC:26634; Q8N239
8276	KLHL35	HGNC:26597; Q6PF15
8277	KLHL36	HGNC:17844; Q8N4N3
8278	KLHL38	HGNC:34435; Q2WGJ6
8279	KLHL40	HGNC:30372; Q2TBA0
8280	KLHL41	HGNC:16905; O60662
8281	KLHL42	HGNC:29252; Q9P2K6
8282	KLK1	HGNC:6357; P06870
8283	KLK2	HGNC:6363; P20151
8284	KLK3	HGNC:6364; P07288
8285	KLK4	HGNC:6365; Q9Y5K2
8286	KLK5	HGNC:6366; Q9Y337
8287	KLK6	HGNC:6367; Q92876
8288	KLK7	HGNC:6368; P49862
8289	KLK8	HGNC:6369; O60259
8290	KLK9	HGNC:6370; Q9UKQ9
8291	KLK10	HGNC:6358; O43240
8292	KLK11	HGNC:6359; Q9UBX7
8293	KLK12	HGNC:6360; Q9UKR0
8294	KLK13	HGNC:6361; Q9UKR3
8295	KLK14	HGNC:6362; Q9P0G3
8296	KLK15	HGNC:20453; Q9H2R5
8297	KLKB1	HGNC:6371; P03952
8298	KLLN	HGNC:37212; B2CW77
8299	KLRB1	HGNC:6373; Q12918
8300	KLRC1	HGNC:6374; P26715
8301	KLRC2	HGNC:6375; P26717
8302	KLRC3	HGNC:6376; Q07444
8303	KLRC4	HGNC:6377; O43908
8304	KLRD1	HGNC:6378; Q13241
8305	KLRF1	HGNC:13342; Q9NZS2
8306	KLRF2	HGNC:37646; D3W0D1
8307	KLRG1	HGNC:6380; Q96E93
8308	KLRG2	HGNC:24778; A4D1S0
8309	KLRK1	HGNC:18788; P26718
8310	KMO	HGNC:6381; O15229
8311	KMT2A	HGNC:7132; Q03164
8312	KMT2B	HGNC:15840; Q9UMN6
8313	KMT2C	HGNC:13726; Q8NEZ4
8314	KMT2D	HGNC:7133; O14686
8315	KMT2E	HGNC:18541; Q8IZD2
8316	KMT5A	HGNC:29489; Q9NQR1
8317	KMT5B	HGNC:24283; Q4FZB7
8318	KMT5C	HGNC:28405; Q86Y97
8319	KNCN	HGNC:26488; A6PVL3
8320	KNDC1	HGNC:29374; Q76NI1
8321	KNG1	HGNC:6383; P01042
8322	KNL1	HGNC:24054; Q8NG31
8323	KNOP1	HGNC:34404; Q1ED39
8324	KNSTRN	HGNC:30767; Q9Y448
8325	KNTC1	HGNC:17255; P50748
8326	KPLCE	HGNC:29468; Q5T750
8327	KPNA1	HGNC:6394; P52294
8328	KPNA2	HGNC:6395; P52292
8329	KPNA3	HGNC:6396; O00505
8330	KPNA4	HGNC:6397; O00629
8331	KPNA5	HGNC:6398; O15131
8332	KPNA6	HGNC:6399; O60684
8333	KPNA7	HGNC:21839; A9QM74
8334	KPNB1	HGNC:6400; Q14974
8335	KPRP	HGNC:31823; Q5T749
8336	KPTN	HGNC:6404; Q9Y664
8337	KRABD1	HGNC:38708; C9JBD0
8338	KRABD2	HGNC:26989; Q6ZNG9
8339	KRABD3	HGNC:22228; A5PL33
8340	KRABD4	HGNC:26007; Q5JUW0
8341	KRABD5	HGNC:26987; Q7Z2F6
8342	KRAS	HGNC:6407; P01116
8343	KRCC1	HGNC:28039; Q9NPI7
8344	KREMEN1	HGNC:17550; Q96MU8
8345	KREMEN2	HGNC:18797; Q8NCW0
8346	KRI1	HGNC:25769; Q8N9T8
8347	KRIT1	HGNC:1573; O00522
8348	KRR1	HGNC:5176; Q13601
8349	KRT1	HGNC:6412; P04264
8350	KRT2	HGNC:6439; P35908
8351	KRT3	HGNC:6440; P12035
8352	KRT4	HGNC:6441; P19013
8353	KRT5	HGNC:6442; P13647
8354	KRT6A	HGNC:6443; P02538
8355	KRT6B	HGNC:6444; P04259
8356	KRT6C	HGNC:20406; P48668
8357	KRT7	HGNC:6445; P08729
8358	KRT8	HGNC:6446; P05787
8359	KRT9	HGNC:6447; P35527
8360	KRT10	HGNC:6413; P13645
8361	KRT12	HGNC:6414; Q99456
8362	KRT13	HGNC:6415; P13646
8363	KRT14	HGNC:6416; P02533
8364	KRT15	HGNC:6421; P19012
8365	KRT16	HGNC:6423; P08779
8366	KRT17	HGNC:6427; Q04695
8367	KRT18	HGNC:6430; P05783
8368	KRT19	HGNC:6436; P08727
8369	KRT20	HGNC:20412; P35900
8370	KRT23	HGNC:6438; Q9C075
8371	KRT24	HGNC:18527; Q2M2I5
8372	KRT25	HGNC:30839; Q7Z3Z0
8373	KRT26	HGNC:30840; Q7Z3Y9
8374	KRT27	HGNC:30841; Q7Z3Y8
8375	KRT28	HGNC:30842; Q7Z3Y7
8376	KRT31	HGNC:6448; Q15323
8377	KRT32	HGNC:6449; Q14532
8378	KRT33A	HGNC:6450; O76009
8379	KRT33B	HGNC:6451; Q14525
8380	KRT34	HGNC:6452; O76011
8381	KRT35	HGNC:6453; Q92764
8382	KRT36	HGNC:6454; O76013
8383	KRT37	HGNC:6455; O76014
8384	KRT38	HGNC:6456; O76015
8385	KRT39	HGNC:32971; Q6A163
8386	KRT40	HGNC:26707; Q6A162
8387	KRT71	HGNC:28927; Q3SY84
8388	KRT72	HGNC:28932; Q14CN4
8389	KRT73	HGNC:28928; Q86Y46
8390	KRT74	HGNC:28929; Q7RTS7
8391	KRT75	HGNC:24431; O95678
8392	KRT76	HGNC:24430; Q01546
8393	KRT77	HGNC:20411; Q7Z794
8394	KRT78	HGNC:28926; Q8N1N4
8395	KRT79	HGNC:28930; Q5XKE5
8396	KRT80	HGNC:27056; Q6KB66
8397	KRT81	HGNC:6458; Q14533
8398	KRT82	HGNC:6459; Q9NSB4
8399	KRT83	HGNC:6460; P78385
8400	KRT84	HGNC:6461; Q9NSB2
8401	KRT85	HGNC:6462; P78386
8402	KRT86	HGNC:6463; O43790
8403	KRT222	HGNC:28695; Q8N1A0
8404	KRTAP1-1	HGNC:16772; Q07627
8405	KRTAP1-3	HGNC:16771; Q8IUG1
8406	KRTAP1-4	HGNC:18904; P0C5Y4
8407	KRTAP1-5	HGNC:16777; Q9BYS1
8408	KRTAP2-1	HGNC:16775; Q9BYU5
8409	KRTAP2-2	HGNC:18905; Q9BYT5
8410	KRTAP2-3	HGNC:18906; P0C7H8
8411	KRTAP2-4	HGNC:18891; Q9BYR9
8412	KRTAP3-1	HGNC:16778; Q9BYR8
8413	KRTAP3-2	HGNC:16779; Q9BYR7
8414	KRTAP3-3	HGNC:18890; Q9BYR6
8415	KRTAP4-1	HGNC:18907; Q9BYQ7
8416	KRTAP4-2	HGNC:18900; Q9BYR5
8417	KRTAP4-3	HGNC:18908; Q9BYR4
8418	KRTAP4-4	HGNC:16928; Q9BYR3
8419	KRTAP4-5	HGNC:18899; Q9BYR2
8420	KRTAP4-6	HGNC:18909; Q9BYQ5
8421	KRTAP4-7	HGNC:18898; Q9BYR0
8422	KRTAP4-8	HGNC:17230; Q9BYQ9
8423	KRTAP4-9	HGNC:18910; Q9BYQ8
8424	KRTAP4-11	HGNC:18911; Q9BYQ6
8425	KRTAP4-12	HGNC:16776; Q9BQ66
8426	KRTAP4-16	HGNC:18921; G5E9R7
8427	KRTAP5-1	HGNC:23596; Q6L8H4
8428	KRTAP5-2	HGNC:23597; Q701N4
8429	KRTAP5-3	HGNC:23598; Q6L8H2
8430	KRTAP5-4	HGNC:23599; Q6L8H1
8431	KRTAP5-5	HGNC:23601; Q701N2
8432	KRTAP5-6	HGNC:23600; Q6L8G9
8433	KRTAP5-7	HGNC:23602; Q6L8G8
8434	KRTAP5-8	HGNC:23603; O75690
8435	KRTAP5-9	HGNC:23604; P26371
8436	KRTAP5-10	HGNC:23605; Q6L8G5
8437	KRTAP5-11	HGNC:23606; Q6L8G4
8438	KRTAP6-1	HGNC:18931; Q3LI64
8439	KRTAP6-2	HGNC:18932; Q3LI66
8440	KRTAP6-3	HGNC:18933; Q3LI67
8441	KRTAP7-1	HGNC:18934; Q8IUC3
8442	KRTAP8-1	HGNC:18935; Q8IUC2
8443	KRTAP9-1	HGNC:18912; A8MXZ3
8444	KRTAP9-2	HGNC:16926; Q9BYQ4
8445	KRTAP9-3	HGNC:16927; Q9BYQ3
8446	KRTAP9-4	HGNC:18902; Q9BYQ2
8447	KRTAP9-6	HGNC:18914; A8MVA2
8448	KRTAP9-7	HGNC:18915; A8MTY7
8449	KRTAP9-8	HGNC:17231; Q9BYQ0
8450	KRTAP9-9	HGNC:16773; Q9BYP9
8451	KRTAP10-1	HGNC:22966; P60331
8452	KRTAP10-2	HGNC:22967; P60368
8453	KRTAP10-3	HGNC:22968; P60369
8454	KRTAP10-4	HGNC:20521; P60372
8455	KRTAP10-5	HGNC:22969; P60370
8456	KRTAP10-6	HGNC:20523; P60371
8457	KRTAP10-7	HGNC:22970; P60409
8458	KRTAP10-8	HGNC:20525; P60410
8459	KRTAP10-9	HGNC:22971; P60411
8460	KRTAP10-10	HGNC:22972; P60014
8461	KRTAP10-11	HGNC:20528; P60412
8462	KRTAP10-12	HGNC:20533; P60413
8463	KRTAP11-1	HGNC:18922; Q8IUC1
8464	KRTAP12-1	HGNC:20529; P59990
8465	KRTAP12-2	HGNC:20530; P59991
8466	KRTAP12-3	HGNC:20531; P60328
8467	KRTAP12-4	HGNC:20532; P60329
8468	KRTAP13-1	HGNC:18924; Q8IUC0
8469	KRTAP13-2	HGNC:18923; Q52LG2
8470	KRTAP13-3	HGNC:18925; Q3SY46
8471	KRTAP13-4	HGNC:18926; Q3LI77
8472	KRTAP15-1	HGNC:18927; Q3LI76
8473	KRTAP16-1	HGNC:18916; A8MUX0
8474	KRTAP17-1	HGNC:18917; Q9BYP8
8475	KRTAP19-1	HGNC:18936; Q8IUB9
8476	KRTAP19-2	HGNC:18937; Q3LHN2
8477	KRTAP19-3	HGNC:18938; Q7Z4W3
8478	KRTAP19-4	HGNC:18939; Q3LI73
8479	KRTAP19-5	HGNC:18940; Q3LI72
8480	KRTAP19-6	HGNC:18941; Q3LI70
8481	KRTAP19-7	HGNC:18942; Q3SYF9
8482	KRTAP19-8	HGNC:33898; Q3LI54
8483	KRTAP20-1	HGNC:18943; Q3LI63
8484	KRTAP20-2	HGNC:18944; Q3LI61
8485	KRTAP20-3	HGNC:34001; Q3LI60
8486	KRTAP20-4	HGNC:34002; Q3LI62
8487	KRTAP21-1	HGNC:18945; Q3LI58
8488	KRTAP21-2	HGNC:18946; Q3LI59
8489	KRTAP21-3	HGNC:34216; Q3LHN1
8490	KRTAP22-1	HGNC:18947; Q3MIV0
8491	KRTAP22-2	HGNC:37091; Q3LI68
8492	KRTAP23-1	HGNC:18928; A1A580
8493	KRTAP24-1	HGNC:33902; Q3LI83
8494	KRTAP25-1	HGNC:34003; Q3LHN0
8495	KRTAP26-1	HGNC:33760; Q6PEX3
8496	KRTAP27-1	HGNC:33864; Q3LI81
8497	KRTAP29-1	HGNC:34211; A8MX34
8498	KRTCAP2	HGNC:28942; Q8N6L1
8499	KRTCAP3	HGNC:28943; Q53RY4
8500	KRTDAP	HGNC:16313; P60985
8501	KSR1	HGNC:6465; Q8IVT5
8502	KSR2	HGNC:18610; Q6VAB6
8503	KTI12	HGNC:25160; Q96EK9
8504	KTN1	HGNC:6467; Q86UP2
8505	KXD1	HGNC:28420; Q9BQD3
8506	KY	HGNC:26576; Q8NBH2
8507	KYAT1	HGNC:1564; Q16773
8508	KYAT3	HGNC:33238; Q6YP21
8509	KYNU	HGNC:6469; Q16719
8510	L1CAM	HGNC:6470; P32004
8511	L1TD1	HGNC:25595; Q5T7N2
8512	L2HGDH	HGNC:20499; Q9H9P8
8513	L3HYPDH	HGNC:20488; Q96EM0
8514	L3MBTL1	HGNC:15905; Q9Y468
8515	L3MBTL2	HGNC:18594; Q969R5
8516	L3MBTL3	HGNC:23035; Q96JM7
8517	L3MBTL4	HGNC:26677; Q8NA19
8518	LACC1	HGNC:26789; Q8IV20
8519	LACRT	HGNC:16430; Q9GZZ8
8520	LACTB	HGNC:16468; P83111
8521	LACTB2	HGNC:18512; Q53H82
8522	LACTBL1	HGNC:35445; A8MY62
8523	LAD1	HGNC:6472; O00515
8524	LAG3	HGNC:6476; P18627
8525	LAGE3	HGNC:26058; Q14657
8526	LAIR1	HGNC:6477; Q6GTX8
8527	LAIR2	HGNC:6478; Q6ISS4
8528	LALBA	HGNC:6480; P00709
8529	LAMA1	HGNC:6481; P25391
8530	LAMA2	HGNC:6482; P24043
8531	LAMA3	HGNC:6483; Q16787
8532	LAMA4	HGNC:6484; Q16363
8533	LAMA5	HGNC:6485; O15230
8534	LAMB1	HGNC:6486; P07942
8535	LAMB2	HGNC:6487; P55268
8536	LAMB3	HGNC:6490; Q13751
8537	LAMB4	HGNC:6491; A4D0S4
8538	LAMC1	HGNC:6492; P11047
8539	LAMC2	HGNC:6493; Q13753
8540	LAMC3	HGNC:6494; Q9Y6N6
8541	LAMP1	HGNC:6499; P11279
8542	LAMP2	HGNC:6501; P13473
8543	LAMP3	HGNC:14582; Q9UQV4
8544	LAMP5	HGNC:16097; Q9UJQ1
8545	LAMTOR1	HGNC:26068; Q6IAA8
8546	LAMTOR2	HGNC:29796; Q9Y2Q5
8547	LAMTOR3	HGNC:15606; Q9UHA4
8548	LAMTOR4	HGNC:33772; Q0VGL1
8549	LAMTOR5	HGNC:17955; O43504
8550	LANCL1	HGNC:6508; O43813
8551	LANCL2	HGNC:6509; Q9NS86
8552	LANCL3	HGNC:24767; Q6ZV70
8553	LAP3	HGNC:18449; P28838
8554	LAPTM4A	HGNC:6924; Q15012
8555	LAPTM4B	HGNC:13646; Q86VI4
8556	LAPTM5	HGNC:29612; Q13571
8557	LARGE1	HGNC:6511; O95461
8558	LARGE2	HGNC:16522; Q8N3Y3
8559	LARP1	HGNC:29531; Q6PKG0
8560	LARP1B	HGNC:24704; Q659C4
8561	LARP4	HGNC:24320; Q71RC2
8562	LARP4B	HGNC:28987; Q92615
8563	LARP6	HGNC:24012; Q9BRS8
8564	LARP7	HGNC:24912; Q4G0J3
8565	LARS1	HGNC:6512; Q9P2J5
8566	LARS2	HGNC:17095; Q15031
8567	LAS1L	HGNC:25726; Q9Y4W2
8568	LASP1	HGNC:6513; Q14847
8569	LASP1NB	HGNC:44353; A0A1B0GWH6
8570	LAT	HGNC:18874; O43561
8571	LAT2	HGNC:12749; Q9GZY6
8572	LATS1	HGNC:6514; O95835
8573	LATS2	HGNC:6515; Q9NRM7
8574	LAX1	HGNC:26005; Q8IWV1
8575	LAYN	HGNC:29471; Q6UX15
8576	LBH	HGNC:29532; Q53QV2
8577	LBHD1	HGNC:28351; Q9BQE6
8578	LBHD2	HGNC:52384; A0A0U1RRK4
8579	LBP	HGNC:6517; P18428
8580	LBR	HGNC:6518; Q14739
8581	LBX1	HGNC:16960; P52954
8582	LBX2	HGNC:15525; Q6XYB7
8583	LCA5	HGNC:31923; Q86VQ0
8584	LCA5L	HGNC:1255; O95447
8585	LCAT	HGNC:6522; P04180
8586	LCE1A	HGNC:29459; Q5T7P2
8587	LCE1B	HGNC:16611; Q5T7P3
8588	LCE1C	HGNC:29464; Q5T751
8589	LCE1D	HGNC:29465; Q5T752
8590	LCE1E	HGNC:29466; Q5T753
8591	LCE1F	HGNC:29467; Q5T754
8592	LCE2A	HGNC:29469; Q5TA79
8593	LCE2B	HGNC:16610; O14633
8594	LCE2C	HGNC:29460; Q5TA81
8595	LCE2D	HGNC:16518; Q5TA82
8596	LCE3A	HGNC:29461; Q5TA76
8597	LCE3B	HGNC:29462; Q5TA77
8598	LCE3C	HGNC:16612; Q5T5A8
8599	LCE3D	HGNC:16615; Q9BYE3
8600	LCE3E	HGNC:29463; Q5T5B0
8601	LCE4A	HGNC:16613; Q5TA78
8602	LCE5A	HGNC:16614; Q5TCM9
8603	LCE6A	HGNC:31824; A0A183
8604	LCE7A	HGNC:55921; P0DV60
8605	LCK	HGNC:6524; P06239
8606	LCLAT1	HGNC:26756; Q6UWP7
8607	LCMT1	HGNC:17557; Q9UIC8
8608	LCMT2	HGNC:17558; O60294
8609	LCN1	HGNC:6525; P31025
8610	LCN2	HGNC:6526; P80188
8611	LCN6	HGNC:17337; P62502
8612	LCN8	HGNC:27038; Q6JVE9
8613	LCN9	HGNC:17442; Q8WX39
8614	LCN10	HGNC:20892; Q6JVE6
8615	LCN12	HGNC:28733; Q6JVE5
8616	LCN15	HGNC:33777; Q6UWW0
8617	LCNL1	HGNC:34436; Q6ZST4
8618	LCOR	HGNC:29503; Q96JN0
8619	LCORL	HGNC:30776; Q8N3X6
8620	LCP1	HGNC:6528; P13796
8621	LCP2	HGNC:6529; Q13094
8622	LCT	HGNC:6530; P09848
8623	LCTL	HGNC:15583; Q6UWM7
8624	LDAF1	HGNC:30136; Q96B96
8625	LDAH	HGNC:26145; Q9H6V9
8626	LDB1	HGNC:6532; Q86U70
8627	LDB2	HGNC:6533; O43679
8628	LDB3	HGNC:15710; O75112
8629	LDHA	HGNC:6535; P00338
8630	LDHAL6A	HGNC:28335; Q6ZMR3
8631	LDHAL6B	HGNC:21481; Q9BYZ2
8632	LDHB	HGNC:6541; P07195
8633	LDHC	HGNC:6544; P07864
8634	LDHD	HGNC:19708; Q86WU2
8635	LDLR	HGNC:6547; P01130
8636	LDLRAD1	HGNC:32069; Q5T700
8637	LDLRAD2	HGNC:32071; Q5SZI1
8638	LDLRAD3	HGNC:27046; Q86YD5
8639	LDLRAD4	HGNC:1224; O15165
8640	LDLRAP1	HGNC:18640; Q5SW96
8641	LDOC1	HGNC:6548; O95751
8642	LEAP2	HGNC:29571; Q969E1
8643	LECT2	HGNC:6550; O14960
8644	LEF1	HGNC:6551; Q9UJU2
8645	LEFTY1	HGNC:6552; O75610
8646	LEFTY2	HGNC:3122; O00292
8647	LEKR1	HGNC:33765; Q6ZMV7
8648	LELP1	HGNC:32046; Q5T871
8649	LEMD1	HGNC:18725; Q68G75
8650	LEMD2	HGNC:21244; Q8NC56
8651	LEMD3	HGNC:28887; Q9Y2U8
8652	LENEP	HGNC:14429; Q9Y5L5
8653	LENG1	HGNC:15502; Q96BZ8
8654	LENG8	HGNC:15500; Q96PV6
8655	LENG9	HGNC:16306; Q96B70
8656	LEO1	HGNC:30401; Q8WVC0
8657	LEP	HGNC:6553; P41159
8658	LEPR	HGNC:6554; P48357
8659	LEPROT	HGNC:29477; O15243
8660	LEPROTL1	HGNC:6555; O95214
8661	LETM1	HGNC:6556; O95202
8662	LETM2	HGNC:14648; Q2VYF4
8663	LETMD1	HGNC:24241; Q6P1Q0
8664	LEUTX	HGNC:31953; A8MZ59
8665	LFNG	HGNC:6560; Q8NES3
8666	LGALS1	HGNC:6561; P09382
8667	LGALS2	HGNC:6562; P05162
8668	LGALS3	HGNC:6563; P17931
8669	LGALS3BP	HGNC:6564; Q08380
8670	LGALS4	HGNC:6565; P56470
8671	LGALS7	HGNC:6568; P47929
8672	LGALS7B	HGNC:34447; P47929
8673	LGALS8	HGNC:6569; O00214
8674	LGALS9	HGNC:6570; O00182
8675	LGALS9B	HGNC:24842; Q3B8N2
8676	LGALS9C	HGNC:33874; Q6DKI2
8677	LGALS12	HGNC:15788; Q96DT0
8678	LGALS13	HGNC:15449; Q9UHV8
8679	LGALS14	HGNC:30054; Q8TCE9
8680	LGALS16	HGNC:40039; A8MUM7
8681	LGALSL	HGNC:25012; Q3ZCW2
8682	LGI1	HGNC:6572; O95970
8683	LGI2	HGNC:18710; Q8N0V4
8684	LGI3	HGNC:18711; Q8N145
8685	LGI4	HGNC:18712; Q8N135
8686	LGMN	HGNC:9472; Q99538
8687	LGR4	HGNC:13299; Q9BXB1
8688	LGR5	HGNC:4504; O75473
8689	LGR6	HGNC:19719; Q9HBX8
8690	LGSN	HGNC:21016; Q5TDP6
8691	LHB	HGNC:6584; P01229
8692	LHCGR	HGNC:6585; P22888
8693	LHFPL1	HGNC:6587; Q86WI0
8694	LHFPL2	HGNC:6588; Q6ZUX7
8695	LHFPL3	HGNC:6589; Q86UP9
8696	LHFPL4	HGNC:29568; Q7Z7J7
8697	LHFPL5	HGNC:21253; Q8TAF8
8698	LHFPL6	HGNC:6586; Q9Y693
8699	LHFPL7	HGNC:33725; Q6ICI0
8700	LHPP	HGNC:30042; Q9H008
8701	LHX1	HGNC:6593; P48742
8702	LHX2	HGNC:6594; P50458
8703	LHX3	HGNC:6595; Q9UBR4
8704	LHX4	HGNC:21734; Q969G2
8705	LHX5	HGNC:14216; Q9H2C1
8706	LHX6	HGNC:21735; Q9UPM6
8707	LHX8	HGNC:28838; Q68G74
8708	LHX9	HGNC:14222; Q9NQ69
8709	LIAS	HGNC:16429; O43766
8710	LIAT1	HGNC:33800; Q6ZQX7
8711	LIF	HGNC:6596; P15018
8712	LIFR	HGNC:6597; P42702
8713	LIG1	HGNC:6598; P18858
8714	LIG3	HGNC:6600; P49916
8715	LIG4	HGNC:6601; P49917
8716	LILRA1	HGNC:6602; O75019
8717	LILRA2	HGNC:6603; Q8N149
8718	LILRA4	HGNC:15503; P59901
8719	LILRA5	HGNC:16309; A6NI73
8720	LILRA6	HGNC:15495; Q6PI73
8721	LILRB1	HGNC:6605; Q8NHL6
8722	LILRB2	HGNC:6606; Q8N423
8723	LILRB3	HGNC:6607; O75022
8724	LILRB4	HGNC:6608; Q8NHJ6
8725	LILRB5	HGNC:6609; O75023
8726	LIM2	HGNC:6610; P55344
8727	LIMA1	HGNC:24636; Q9UHB6
8728	LIMCH1	HGNC:29191; Q9UPQ0
8729	LIMD1	HGNC:6612; Q9UGP4
8730	LIMD2	HGNC:28142; Q9BT23
8731	LIME1	HGNC:26016; Q9H400
8732	LIMK1	HGNC:6613; P53667
8733	LIMK2	HGNC:6614; P53671
8734	LIMS1	HGNC:6616; P48059
8735	LIMS2	HGNC:16084; Q7Z4I7
8736	LIMS3	HGNC:30047; P0CW19
8737	LIMS4	HGNC:39941; P0CW20
8738	LIN7A	HGNC:17787; O14910
8739	LIN7B	HGNC:17788; Q9HAP6
8740	LIN7C	HGNC:17789; Q9NUP9
8741	LIN9	HGNC:30830; Q5TKA1
8742	LIN28A	HGNC:15986; Q9H9Z2
8743	LIN28B	HGNC:32207; Q6ZN17
8744	LIN37	HGNC:33234; Q96GY3
8745	LIN52	HGNC:19856; Q52LA3
8746	LIN54	HGNC:25397; Q6MZP7
8747	LINGO1	HGNC:21205; Q96FE5
8748	LINGO2	HGNC:21207; Q7L985
8749	LINGO3	HGNC:21206; P0C6S8
8750	LINGO4	HGNC:31814; Q6UY18
8751	LINS1	HGNC:30922; Q8NG48
8752	LIPA	HGNC:6617; P38571
8753	LIPC	HGNC:6619; P11150
8754	LIPE	HGNC:6621; Q05469
8755	LIPF	HGNC:6622; P07098
8756	LIPG	HGNC:6623; Q9Y5X9
8757	LIPH	HGNC:18483; Q8WWY8
8758	LIPI	HGNC:18821; Q6XZB0
8759	LIPJ	HGNC:21773; Q5W064
8760	LIPK	HGNC:23444; Q5VXJ0
8761	LIPM	HGNC:23455; Q5VYY2
8762	LIPN	HGNC:23452; Q5VXI9
8763	LIPT1	HGNC:29569; Q9Y234
8764	LIPT2	HGNC:37216; A6NK58
8765	LITAF	HGNC:16841; Q99732
8766	LITAFD	HGNC:53927; A0A1B0GVX0
8767	LIX1	HGNC:18581; Q8N485
8768	LIX1L	HGNC:28715; Q8IVB5
8769	LKAAEAR1	HGNC:33718; Q8TD35
8770	LLCFC1	HGNC:21750; Q96L11
8771	LLGL1	HGNC:6628; Q15334
8772	LLGL2	HGNC:6629; Q6P1M3
8773	LLPH	HGNC:28229; Q9BRT6
8774	LMAN1	HGNC:6631; P49257
8775	LMAN1L	HGNC:6632; Q9HAT1
8776	LMAN2	HGNC:16986; Q12907
8777	LMAN2L	HGNC:19263; Q9H0V9
8778	LMBR1	HGNC:13243; Q8WVP7
8779	LMBR1L	HGNC:18268; Q6UX01
8780	LMBRD1	HGNC:23038; Q9NUN5
8781	LMBRD2	HGNC:25287; Q68DH5
8782	LMCD1	HGNC:6633; Q9NZU5
8783	LMF1	HGNC:14154; Q96S06
8784	LMF2	HGNC:25096; Q9BU23
8785	LMLN	HGNC:15991; Q96KR4
8786	LMNA	HGNC:6636; P02545
8787	LMNB1	HGNC:6637; P20700
8788	LMNB2	HGNC:6638; Q03252
8789	LMNTD1	HGNC:26683; Q8N9Z9
8790	LMNTD2	HGNC:28561; Q8IXW0
8791	LMO1	HGNC:6641; P25800
8792	LMO2	HGNC:6642; P25791
8793	LMO3	HGNC:6643; Q8TAP4
8794	LMO4	HGNC:6644; P61968
8795	LMO7	HGNC:6646; Q8WWI1
8796	LMOD1	HGNC:6647; P29536
8797	LMOD2	HGNC:6648; Q6P5Q4
8798	LMOD3	HGNC:6649; Q0VAK6
8799	LMTK2	HGNC:17880; Q8IWU2
8800	LMTK3	HGNC:19295; Q96Q04
8801	LMX1A	HGNC:6653; Q8TE12
8802	LMX1B	HGNC:6654; O60663
8803	LNP1	HGNC:28014; A1A4G5
8804	LNPEP	HGNC:6656; Q9UIQ6
8805	LNPK	HGNC:21610; Q9C0E8
8806	LNX1	HGNC:6657; Q8TBB1
8807	LNX2	HGNC:20421; Q8N448
8808	LONP1	HGNC:9479; P36776
8809	LONP2	HGNC:20598; Q86WA8
8810	LONRF1	HGNC:26302; Q17RB8
8811	LONRF2	HGNC:24788; Q1L5Z9
8812	LONRF3	HGNC:21152; Q496Y0
8813	LORICRIN	HGNC:6663; P23490
8814	LOX	HGNC:6664; P28300
8815	LOXHD1	HGNC:26521; Q8IVV2
8816	LOXL1	HGNC:6665; Q08397
8817	LOXL2	HGNC:6666; Q9Y4K0
8818	LOXL3	HGNC:13869; P58215
8819	LOXL4	HGNC:17171; Q96JB6
8820	LPA	HGNC:6667; P08519
8821	LPAR1	HGNC:3166; Q92633
8822	LPAR2	HGNC:3168; Q9HBW0
8823	LPAR3	HGNC:14298; Q9UBY5
8824	LPAR4	HGNC:4478; Q99677
8825	LPAR5	HGNC:13307; Q9H1C0
8826	LPAR6	HGNC:15520; P43657
8827	LPCAT1	HGNC:25718; Q8NF37
8828	LPCAT2	HGNC:26032; Q7L5N7
8829	LPCAT3	HGNC:30244; Q6P1A2
8830	LPCAT4	HGNC:30059; Q643R3
8831	LPGAT1	HGNC:28985; Q92604
8832	LPIN1	HGNC:13345; Q14693
8833	LPIN2	HGNC:14450; Q92539
8834	LPIN3	HGNC:14451; Q9BQK8
8835	LPL	HGNC:6677; P06858
8836	LPO	HGNC:6678; P22079
8837	LPP	HGNC:6679; Q93052
8838	LPXN	HGNC:14061; O60711
8839	LRAT	HGNC:6685; O95237
8840	LRATD1	HGNC:20743; Q96KN4
8841	LRATD2	HGNC:24166; Q96KN1
8842	LRBA	HGNC:1742; P50851
8843	LRCH1	HGNC:20309; Q9Y2L9
8844	LRCH2	HGNC:29292; Q5VUJ6
8845	LRCH3	HGNC:28637; Q96II8
8846	LRCH4	HGNC:6691; O75427
8847	LRCOL1	HGNC:44160; A6NCL2
8848	LRFN1	HGNC:29290; Q9P244
8849	LRFN2	HGNC:21226; Q9ULH4
8850	LRFN3	HGNC:28370; Q9BTN0
8851	LRFN4	HGNC:28456; Q6PJG9
8852	LRFN5	HGNC:20360; Q96NI6
8853	LRG1	HGNC:29480; P02750
8854	LRGUK	HGNC:21964; Q96M69
8855	LRIF1	HGNC:30299; Q5T3J3
8856	LRIG1	HGNC:17360; Q96JA1
8857	LRIG2	HGNC:20889; O94898
8858	LRIG3	HGNC:30991; Q6UXM1
8859	LRIT1	HGNC:23404; Q9P2V4
8860	LRIT2	HGNC:23443; A6NDA9
8861	LRIT3	HGNC:24783; Q3SXY7
8862	LRMDA	HGNC:23405; Q9H2I8
8863	LRP1	HGNC:6692; Q07954
8864	LRP1B	HGNC:6693; Q9NZR2
8865	LRP2	HGNC:6694; P98164
8866	LRP2BP	HGNC:25434; Q9P2M1
8867	LRP3	HGNC:6695; O75074
8868	LRP4	HGNC:6696; O75096
8869	LRP5	HGNC:6697; O75197
8870	LRP6	HGNC:6698; O75581
8871	LRP8	HGNC:6700; Q14114
8872	LRP10	HGNC:14553; Q7Z4F1
8873	LRP11	HGNC:16936; Q86VZ4
8874	LRP12	HGNC:31708; Q9Y561
8875	LRPAP1	HGNC:6701; P30533
8876	LRPPRC	HGNC:15714; P42704
8877	LRR1	HGNC:19742; Q96L50
8878	LRRC1	HGNC:14307; Q9BTT6
8879	LRRC2	HGNC:14676; Q9BYS8
8880	LRRC3	HGNC:14965; Q9BY71
8881	LRRC3B	HGNC:28105; Q96PB8
8882	LRRC3C	HGNC:40034; A6NJW4
8883	LRRC4	HGNC:15586; Q9HBW1
8884	LRRC4B	HGNC:25042; Q9NT99
8885	LRRC4C	HGNC:29317; Q9HCJ2
8886	LRRC7	HGNC:18531; Q96NW7
8887	LRRC8A	HGNC:19027; Q8IWT6
8888	LRRC8B	HGNC:30692; Q6P9F7
8889	LRRC8C	HGNC:25075; Q8TDW0
8890	LRRC8D	HGNC:16992; Q7L1W4
8891	LRRC8E	HGNC:26272; Q6NSJ5
8892	LRRC9	HGNC:19848; Q6ZRR7
8893	LRRC10	HGNC:20264; Q5BKY1
8894	LRRC10B	HGNC:37215; A6NIK2
8895	LRRC14	HGNC:20419; Q15048
8896	LRRC14B	HGNC:37268; A6NHZ5
8897	LRRC15	HGNC:20818; Q8TF66
8898	LRRC17	HGNC:16895; Q8N6Y2
8899	LRRC18	HGNC:23199; Q8N456
8900	LRRC19	HGNC:23379; Q9H756
8901	LRRC20	HGNC:23421; Q8TCA0
8902	LRRC23	HGNC:19138; Q53EV4
8903	LRRC24	HGNC:28947; Q50LG9
8904	LRRC25	HGNC:29806; Q8N386
8905	LRRC26	HGNC:31409; Q2I0M4
8906	LRRC27	HGNC:29346; Q9C0I9
8907	LRRC28	HGNC:28355; Q86X40
8908	LRRC30	HGNC:30219; A6NM36
8909	LRRC31	HGNC:26261; Q6UY01
8910	LRRC32	HGNC:4161; Q14392
8911	LRRC34	HGNC:28408; Q8IZ02
8912	LRRC36	HGNC:25615; Q1X8D7
8913	LRRC37A	HGNC:29069; A6NMS7
8914	LRRC37A2	HGNC:32404; A6NM11
8915	LRRC37A3	HGNC:32427; O60309
8916	LRRC37B	HGNC:29070; Q96QE4
8917	LRRC38	HGNC:27005; Q5VT99
8918	LRRC39	HGNC:28228; Q96DD0
8919	LRRC40	HGNC:26004; Q9H9A6
8920	LRRC41	HGNC:16917; Q15345
8921	LRRC42	HGNC:28792; Q9Y546
8922	LRRC43	HGNC:28562; Q8N309
8923	LRRC45	HGNC:28302; Q96CN5
8924	LRRC46	HGNC:25047; Q96FV0
8925	LRRC47	HGNC:29207; Q8N1G4
8926	LRRC49	HGNC:25965; Q8IUZ0
8927	LRRC51	HGNC:55526; Q96E66
8928	LRRC52	HGNC:32156; Q8N7C0
8929	LRRC53	HGNC:25255; A6NM62
8930	LRRC55	HGNC:32324; Q6ZSA7
8931	LRRC56	HGNC:25430; Q8IYG6
8932	LRRC57	HGNC:26719; Q8N9N7
8933	LRRC58	HGNC:26968; Q96CX6
8934	LRRC59	HGNC:28817; Q96AG4
8935	LRRC61	HGNC:21704; Q9BV99
8936	LRRC63	HGNC:34296; Q05C16
8937	LRRC66	HGNC:34299; Q68CR7
8938	LRRC69	HGNC:34303; Q6ZNQ3
8939	LRRC70	HGNC:35155; Q7Z2Q7
8940	LRRC71	HGNC:26556; Q8N4P6
8941	LRRC72	HGNC:42972; A6NJI9
8942	LRRC73	HGNC:21375; Q5JTD7
8943	LRRC74A	HGNC:23346; Q0VAA2
8944	LRRC74B	HGNC:34301; Q6ZQY2
8945	LRRC75A	HGNC:32403; Q8NAA5
8946	LRRC75B	HGNC:33155; Q2VPJ9
8947	LRRCC1	HGNC:29373; Q9C099
8948	LRRD1	HGNC:34300; A4D1F6
8949	LRRFIP1	HGNC:6702; Q32MZ4
8950	LRRFIP2	HGNC:6703; Q9Y608
8951	LRRIQ1	HGNC:25708; Q96JM4
8952	LRRIQ3	HGNC:28318; A6PVS8
8953	LRRIQ4	HGNC:34298; A6NIV6
8954	LRRK1	HGNC:18608; Q38SD2
8955	LRRK2	HGNC:18618; Q5S007
8956	LRRN1	HGNC:20980; Q6UXK5
8957	LRRN2	HGNC:16914; O75325
8958	LRRN3	HGNC:17200; Q9H3W5
8959	LRRN4	HGNC:16208; Q8WUT4
8960	LRRN4CL	HGNC:33724; Q8ND94
8961	LRRTM1	HGNC:19408; Q86UE6
8962	LRRTM2	HGNC:19409; O43300
8963	LRRTM3	HGNC:19410; Q86VH5
8964	LRRTM4	HGNC:19411; Q86VH4
8965	LRSAM1	HGNC:25135; Q6UWE0
8966	LRTM1	HGNC:25023; Q9HBL6
8967	LRTM2	HGNC:32443; Q8N967
8968	LRTM3	HGNC:26851; Q8NDH2
8969	LRWD1	HGNC:21769; Q9UFC0
8970	LSAMP	HGNC:6705; Q13449
8971	LSG1	HGNC:25652; Q9H089
8972	LSM1	HGNC:20472; O15116
8973	LSM2	HGNC:13940; Q9Y333
8974	LSM3	HGNC:17874; P62310
8975	LSM4	HGNC:17259; Q9Y4Z0
8976	LSM5	HGNC:17162; Q9Y4Y9
8977	LSM6	HGNC:17017; P62312
8978	LSM7	HGNC:20470; Q9UK45
8979	LSM8	HGNC:20471; O95777
8980	LSM10	HGNC:17562; Q969L4
8981	LSM11	HGNC:30860; P83369
8982	LSM12	HGNC:26407; Q3MHD2
8983	LSM14A	HGNC:24489; Q8ND56
8984	LSM14B	HGNC:15887; Q9BX40
8985	LSMEM1	HGNC:22036; Q8N8F7
8986	LSMEM2	HGNC:26781; Q8N112
8987	LSP1	HGNC:6707; P33241
8988	LSR	HGNC:29572; Q86X29
8989	LSS	HGNC:6708; P48449
8990	LST1	HGNC:14189; O00453
8991	LTA	HGNC:6709; P01374
8992	LTA4H	HGNC:6710; P09960
8993	LTAP1	HGNC:29876; Q9BWL3
8994	LTB	HGNC:6711; Q06643
8995	LTB4R	HGNC:6713; Q15722
8996	LTB4R2	HGNC:19260; Q9NPC1
8997	LTBP1	HGNC:6714; Q14766
8998	LTBP2	HGNC:6715; Q14767
8999	LTBP3	HGNC:6716; Q9NS15
9000	LTBP4	HGNC:6717; Q8N2S1
