= KRABD2 =

Protein-coding gene in humans

Identifiers
- Aliases: KRABD2, KRAB-A domain containing 2, KRBA2, KRAB domain containing 2
- External IDs: GeneCards: KRABD2

Gene location (Human)
Chr.	Chromosome 17 (human)
Band	17p13.1	Start	8,356,902 bp
Band	17p13.1	End	8,376,704 bp
RNA expression pattern
Bgee	Human / Mouse (ortholog); Top expressed in: apex of heart; left ventricle; ganglionic eminence; right auricle of heart; testicle; ventricular zone; Achilles tendon; muscle of thigh; stromal cell of endometrium; islet of Langerhans / n/a; More reference expression data
BioGPS	n/a
Gene ontology
Molecular function	nucleic acid binding
Cellular component	intracellular anatomical structure
Biological process	regulation of transcription, DNA-templated; DNA integration
Sources:Amigo / QuickGO
Orthologs
Databases	NCBI: entry; OMA: entry
Species	Human	Mouse
Entrez	124751	n/a
Ensembl	ENSG00000184619	n/a
UniProt	Q6ZNG9	n/a
RefSeq (mRNA)	NM_001304947; NM_213597	n/a
RefSeq (protein)	NP_001291876; NP_998762	n/a
Location (UCSC)	Chr 17: 8.36 – 8.38 Mb	n/a
PubMed search		n/a
- Wikidata
View/Edit Human

KRAB domain-containing protein 2 is a protein that in humans is encoded by the KRABD2 gene (previously KRBA2).
