= LIPF =

LIPF, LiPF, or Lipf may refer to:

- Ferrara Airport: an airport with ICAO code LIPF (see List of airports in Italy)
- Labrador Inuit Pidgin French: A pidgin language spoken in Strait of Belle Isle in Canada
- Lianzhou International Photography Festival: a festival hosted by Lianzhou
- Gastric lipase: enzyme in humans encoded by the gene LIPF
- Lingual lipase: enzyme in mice and rats encoded by the gene Lipf

== See also ==
- Lithium hexafluorophosphate or LiPF6: a compound found in some lithium ion batteries
