= INTS7 =

Protein-coding gene in humans

Identifiers
- Aliases: INTS7, C1orf73, INT7, integrator complex subunit 7
- External IDs: OMIM: 611350; MGI: 1924315; GeneCards: INTS7

Gene location (Human)
| Chr. | Chromosome 1 (human) |
| Band | 1q32.3 | Start | 211,940,399 bp |
| Band | 1q32.3 | End | 212,035,557 bp |

Gene location (Mouse)
| Chr. | Chromosome 1 (mouse) |
| Band | 1|1 H6 | Start | 191,307,748 bp |
| Band | 1|1 H6 | End | 191,355,800 bp |
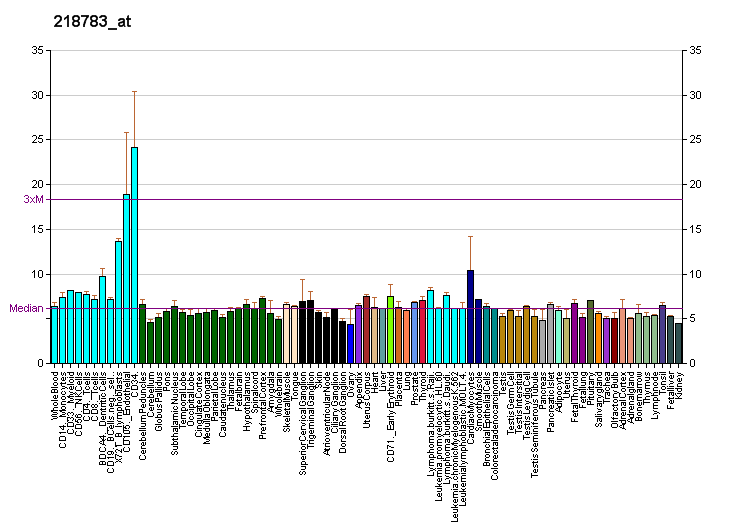

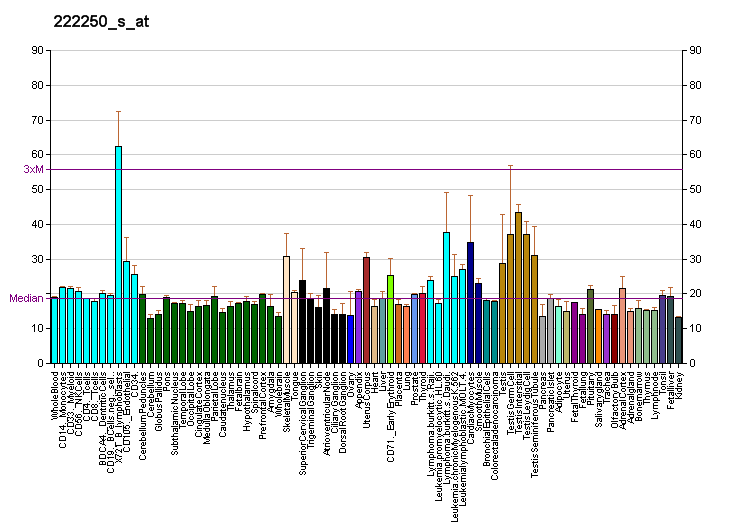
RNA expression pattern
| Bgee | Human / Mouse (ortholog); Top expressed in: ganglionic eminence; sperm; ventricular zone; gonad; testicle; right testis; left testis; islet of Langerhans; right lobe of liver; mucosa of transverse colon / Top expressed in: cumulus cell; primitive streak; endocardial cushion; maxillary prominence; hair follicle; spermatocyte; human fetus; mandibular prominence; medial ganglionic eminence; ureter; More reference expression data |
| BioGPS | More reference expression data |
Gene ontology
| Molecular function | protein binding |
| Cellular component | integrator complex; chromosome; nucleoplasm; nucleus; cytoplasm; nuclear body |
| Biological process | cellular response to ionizing radiation; DNA damage checkpoint signaling; snRNA processing; cellular response to DNA damage stimulus; snRNA transcription by RNA polymerase II; snRNA 3'-end processing |
Sources:Amigo / QuickGO
Orthologs
| Databases | NCBI: entry; OMA: entry |
| Species | Human | Mouse |
| Entrez | 25896 | 77065 |
| Ensembl | ENSG00000143493 | ENSMUSG00000037461 |
| UniProt | Q9NVH2 | Q7TQK1 |
| RefSeq (mRNA) | NM_001199809; NM_001199811; NM_001199812; NM_015434 | NM_178632; NM_001306203; NM_001306204 |
| RefSeq (protein) | NP_001186738; NP_001186740; NP_001186741; NP_056249 | NP_001293132; NP_001293133; NP_848747 |
| Location (UCSC) | Chr 1: 211.94 – 212.04 Mb | Chr 1: 191.31 – 191.36 Mb |
| PubMed search |
- Wikidata
| View/Edit Human | View/Edit Mouse |

Integrator complex subunit 7 is a protein that in humans is encoded by the INTS7 gene.
