= HMCES =

Protein-coding gene in the species Homo sapiens

Identifiers
- Aliases: HMCES, C3orf37, SRAPD1, DC12, 5-hydroxymethylcytosine (hmC) binding, ES cell-specific, 5-hydroxymethylcytosine binding, ES cell specific
- External IDs: OMIM: 618288; MGI: 1914053; GeneCards: HMCES

Gene location (Human)
Chr.	Chromosome 3 (human)
Band	3q21.3	Start	129,278,828 bp
Band	3q21.3	End	129,306,186 bp

Gene location (Mouse)
Chr.	Chromosome 6 (mouse)
Band	6|6 D1	Start	87,890,917 bp
Band	6|6 D1	End	87,913,611 bp
RNA expression pattern
Bgee	Human / Mouse (ortholog); Top expressed in: islet of Langerhans; gastrocnemius muscle; ventricular zone; ganglionic eminence; mucosa of transverse colon; muscle of thigh; lymph node; apex of heart; secondary oocyte; left testis / Top expressed in: zygote; primary oocyte; secondary oocyte; embryo; tail of embryo; yolk sac; ventricular zone; granulocyte; genital tubercle; right kidney; More reference expression data
BioGPS	n/a
Orthologs
Databases	NCBI: entry; OMA: entry
Species	Human	Mouse
Entrez	56941	232210
Ensembl	ENSG00000183624	ENSMUSG00000030060
UniProt	Q96FZ2	Q8R1M0
RefSeq (mRNA)	NM_001006109; NM_020187; NM_001363881; NM_001370343; NM_001370344 NM_001370345	NM_173737
RefSeq (protein)	NP_001006109; NP_064572; NP_001350810; NP_001357272; NP_001357273 NP_001357274	NP_776098
Location (UCSC)	Chr 3: 129.28 – 129.31 Mb	Chr 6: 87.89 – 87.91 Mb
PubMed search
- Wikidata
View/Edit Human	View/Edit Mouse

5-hydroxymethylcytosine binding, ES cell specific is a protein that in humans is encoded by the HMCES gene.
