= Haloacid dehalogenase like hydrolase domain containing 5 =

Protein-coding gene in the species Homo sapiens

HDHD5

Identifiers
- Aliases: HDHD5, CECR5, haloacid dehalogenase like hydrolase domain containing 5
- External IDs: MGI: 2136976; HomoloGene: 32816; GeneCards: HDHD5; OMA:HDHD5 - orthologs

Gene location (Human)
Chr.	Chromosome 22 (human)
Band	22q11.1	Start	17,137,511 bp
Band	22q11.1	End	17,165,287 bp

Gene location (Mouse)
Chr.	Chromosome 6 (mouse)
Band	6 F1|6 56.95 cM	Start	120,509,494 bp
Band	6 F1|6 56.95 cM	End	120,531,319 bp
RNA expression pattern
Bgee	Human / Mouse (ortholog); Top expressed in: apex of heart; left ventricle; right lobe of liver; pancreatic ductal cell; mucosa of transverse colon; gastrocnemius muscle; right adrenal gland; right adrenal cortex; left adrenal gland; gonad / Top expressed in: interventricular septum; right kidney; neural layer of retina; cardiac muscle tissue of left ventricle; spermatocyte; muscle of thigh; extensor digitorum longus muscle; plantaris muscle; visual cortex; superior frontal gyrus; More reference expression data
BioGPS	n/a
Orthologs
Species	Human	Mouse
Entrez	27440	214932
Ensembl	ENSG00000069998	ENSMUSG00000058979
UniProt	Q9BXW7	Q91WM2
RefSeq (mRNA)	NM_017829; NM_033070	NM_144815
RefSeq (protein)	NP_060299; NP_149061	NP_659064
Location (UCSC)	Chr 22: 17.14 – 17.17 Mb	Chr 6: 120.51 – 120.53 Mb
PubMed search
- Wikidata
View/Edit Human	View/Edit Mouse

Haloacid dehalogenase like hydrolase domain containing 5 is a protein that in humans is encoded by the HDHD5 gene.
