= HYKK =

Protein-coding gene in humans

Identifiers
- Aliases: HYKK, AGPHD1, hydroxylysine kinase
- External IDs: OMIM: 614681; MGI: 2443139; GeneCards: HYKK
Enzyme activity
EC #	BRENDA	ExPASy	KEGG	MetaCyc
2.7.1.81	↗	↗	↗	↗

Gene location (Human)
Chr.	Chromosome 15 (human)
Band	15q25.1	Start	78,507,564 bp
Band	15q25.1	End	78,537,372 bp

Gene location (Mouse)
Chr.	Chromosome 9 (mouse)
Band	9|9 B	Start	54,824,567 bp
Band	9|9 B	End	54,857,208 bp
RNA expression pattern
Bgee	Human / Mouse (ortholog); Top expressed in: olfactory zone of nasal mucosa; Achilles tendon; mucosa of ileum; testicle; gonad; gastric mucosa; tibialis anterior muscle; body of pancreas; gastrocnemius muscle; right ovary / Top expressed in: proximal tubule; human kidney; right kidney; left lobe of liver; olfactory epithelium; pineal gland; fossa; otolith organ; utricle; lumbar subsegment of spinal cord; More reference expression data
BioGPS	n/a
Gene ontology
Molecular function	transferase activity; kinase activity; hydroxylysine kinase activity; protein binding
Cellular component	cytoplasm; mitochondrial matrix
Biological process	lysine catabolic process; phosphorylation
Sources:Amigo / QuickGO
Orthologs
Databases	NCBI: entry; OMA: entry
Species	Human	Mouse
Entrez	123688	235386
Ensembl	ENSG00000188266	ENSMUSG00000035878
UniProt	A2RU49	Q5U5V2
RefSeq (mRNA)	NM_001013619; NM_001083612	NM_177351
RefSeq (protein)	NP_001013641; NP_001077081	NP_796325
Location (UCSC)	Chr 15: 78.51 – 78.54 Mb	Chr 9: 54.82 – 54.86 Mb
PubMed search
- Wikidata
View/Edit Human	View/Edit Mouse

Hydroxylysine kinase (EC 2.7.1.81) is a protein that in humans is encoded by the HYKK gene. Hydroxylysine kinase is a small molecule kinase that catalyzes the transfer of a phosphate group to 5-hydroxy-L-lysine. It belongs to the aminoglycoside phosphotransferase family of enzymes, and participates in the lysine degradation pathway.

Pathogenic variants of hydroxylysine kinase are associated with chronic obstructive pulmonary disease.
