= HIVEP1 =

Protein-coding gene in the species Homo sapiens

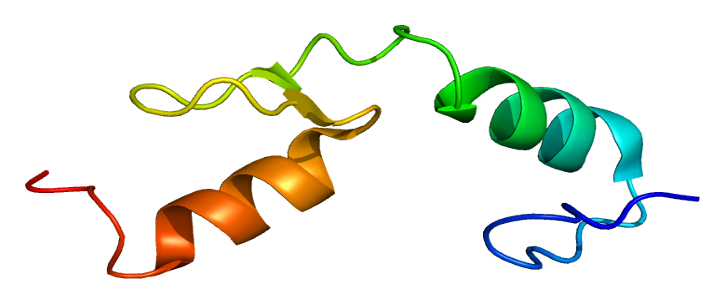

Identifiers
- Aliases: HIVEP1, CIRIP, CRYBP1, GAAP, MBP-1, PRDII-BF1, Schnurri-1, ZAS1, ZNF40, ZNF40A, human immunodeficiency virus type I enhancer binding protein 1, HIVEP zinc finger 1
- External IDs: OMIM: 194540; MGI: 96100; GeneCards: HIVEP1
Available structures
PDB	Ortholog search: PDBe RCSB
PDB	List of PDB id codes 1BBO, 4ZNF

Gene location (Human)
Chr.	Chromosome 6 (human)
Band	6p24.1	Start	12,008,762 bp
Band	6p24.1	End	12,164,999 bp

Gene location (Mouse)
Chr.	Chromosome 13 (mouse)
Band	13 A4|13 20.72 cM	Start	42,205,497 bp
Band	13 A4|13 20.72 cM	End	42,346,013 bp
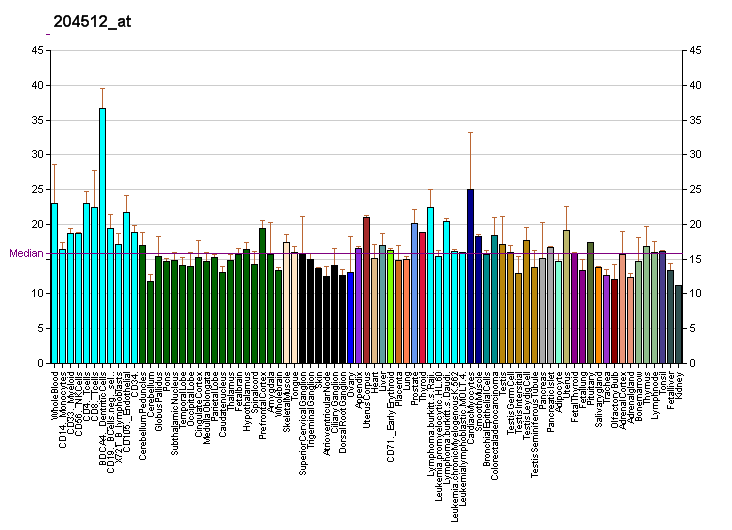
RNA expression pattern
Bgee	Human / Mouse (ortholog); Top expressed in: Achilles tendon; cartilage tissue; sural nerve; epithelium of colon; superficial temporal artery; jejunal mucosa; seminal vesicula; oral cavity; right lobe of liver; caput epididymis / Top expressed in: zygote; genital tubercle; secondary oocyte; primary oocyte; tail of embryo; medial dorsal nucleus; lateral geniculate nucleus; primary motor cortex; habenula; medial geniculate nucleus; More reference expression data
BioGPS	More reference expression data
Gene ontology
Molecular function	RNA polymerase II cis-regulatory region sequence-specific DNA binding; DNA binding; sequence-specific DNA binding; DNA-binding transcription repressor activity, RNA polymerase II-specific; protein binding; metal ion binding; nucleic acid binding; DNA-binding transcription factor activity, RNA polymerase II-specific
Cellular component	cytoplasm; mitochondrion; nucleus; nucleoplasm; nuclear body
Biological process	multicellular organism development; regulation of transcription, DNA-templated; negative regulation of transcription by RNA polymerase II; transcription by RNA polymerase II; signal transduction; transcription, DNA-templated; BMP signaling pathway; positive regulation of transcription by RNA polymerase II
Sources:Amigo / QuickGO
Orthologs
Databases	NCBI: entry; OMA: entry
Species	Human	Mouse
Entrez	3096	110521
Ensembl	ENSG00000095951	ENSMUSG00000021366
UniProt	P15822	Q03172
RefSeq (mRNA)	NM_002114	NM_007772
RefSeq (protein)	NP_002105	NP_031798
Location (UCSC)	Chr 6: 12.01 – 12.16 Mb	Chr 13: 42.21 – 42.35 Mb
PubMed search
- Wikidata
View/Edit Human	View/Edit Mouse

Zinc finger protein 40 is a protein that in humans is encoded by the HIVEP1 gene.

Members of the ZAS family, such as ZAS1 (HIVEP1), are large proteins that contain a ZAS domain, a modular protein structure consisting of a pair of C2H2 zinc fingers with an acidic-rich region and a serine/threonine-rich sequence. These proteins bind specific DNA sequences, including the kappa-B motif (GGGACTTTCC), in the promoters and enhancer regions of several genes and viruses, including human immunodeficiency virus (HIV). ZAS genes span more than 150 kb and contain at least 10 exons, one of which is longer than 5.5 kb (Allen and Wu, 2004).[supplied by OMIM]
