= IGFLR1 =

Protein-coding gene in the species Homo sapiens

Identifiers
- Aliases: IGFLR1, TMEM149, U2AF1L4, IGF like family receptor 1
- External IDs: OMIM: 614143; MGI: 3655979; HomoloGene: 49779; GeneCards: IGFLR1; OMA:IGFLR1 - orthologs

Gene location (Human)
Chr.	Chromosome 19 (human)
Band	19q13.12	Start	35,738,801 bp
Band	19q13.12	End	35,742,453 bp

Gene location (Mouse)
Chr.	Chromosome 7 (mouse)
Band	7|7 B1	Start	30,264,852 bp
Band	7|7 B1	End	30,267,387 bp
RNA expression pattern
Bgee	Human / Mouse (ortholog); Top expressed in: granulocyte; blood; monocyte; lymph node; appendix; spleen; right lobe of liver; gonad; bone marrow cell; right adrenal gland / Top expressed in: bone marrow; morula; islet of Langerhans; spleen; granulocyte; adrenal gland; embryo; striatum of neuraxis; thymus; duodenum; More reference expression data
BioGPS	n/a
Orthologs
Species	Human	Mouse
Entrez	79713	101883
Ensembl	ENSG00000126246	ENSMUSG00000036826
UniProt	Q9H665	Q3U4N7
RefSeq (mRNA)	NM_001346003; NM_001346004; NM_001346005; NM_001346006; NM_024660	NM_145580
RefSeq (protein)	NP_001332932; NP_001332933; NP_001332934; NP_001332935; NP_078936	NP_663555
Location (UCSC)	Chr 19: 35.74 – 35.74 Mb	Chr 7: 30.26 – 30.27 Mb
PubMed search
- Wikidata
View/Edit Human	View/Edit Mouse

IGF like family receptor 1 is a protein that in humans is encoded by the IGFLR1 gene.
