= LRRC26 =

Protein-coding gene in the species Homo sapiens

Identifiers
- Aliases: LRRC26, CAPC, bA350O14.10, leucine rich repeat containing 26
- External IDs: OMIM: 613505; MGI: 2385129; GeneCards: LRRC26

Gene location (Human)
Chr.	Chromosome 9 (human)
Band	9q34.3	Start	137,168,758 bp
Band	9q34.3	End	137,170,051 bp

Gene location (Mouse)
Chr.	Chromosome 2 (mouse)
Band	2|2 A3	Start	25,179,927 bp
Band	2|2 A3	End	25,181,192 bp
RNA expression pattern
Bgee	Human / Mouse (ortholog); Top expressed in: olfactory zone of nasal mucosa; salivary gland; minor salivary glands; mucosa of transverse colon; prostate; right uterine tube; granulocyte; duodenum; skin of leg; skin of abdomen / Top expressed in: ileum; duodenum; colon; jejunum; foregut; stomach; lung; urinary bladder; embryo; olfactory bulb; More reference expression data
BioGPS	n/a
Gene ontology
Molecular function	potassium channel regulator activity; protein binding; voltage-gated potassium channel activity; transmembrane transporter binding; potassium channel activator activity
Cellular component	cytoplasm; integral component of membrane; voltage-gated potassium channel complex; extracellular exosome; cytoskeleton; membrane; fibrillar center; nucleolus; plasma membrane; integral component of plasma membrane
Biological process	ion transport; potassium ion transmembrane transport; positive regulation of voltage-gated potassium channel activity; transport
Sources:Amigo / QuickGO
Orthologs
Databases	NCBI: entry; OMA: entry
Species	Human	Mouse
Entrez	389816	227618
Ensembl	ENSG00000184709	ENSMUSG00000026961
UniProt	Q2I0M4	Q91W20
RefSeq (mRNA)	NM_001013653	NM_146117
RefSeq (protein)	NP_001013675	NP_666229
Location (UCSC)	Chr 9: 137.17 – 137.17 Mb	Chr 2: 25.18 – 25.18 Mb
PubMed search
- Wikidata
View/Edit Human	View/Edit Mouse

Leucine rich repeat containing 26 (LRRC26) is a protein that in humans is encoded by the LRRC26 gene.
