= KCMF1 =

Protein-coding gene in the species Homo sapiens

Identifiers
- Aliases: KCMF1, DEBT91, FIGC, PCMF, ZZZ1, potassium channel modulatory factor 1
- External IDs: OMIM: 614719; MGI: 1921537; GeneCards: KCMF1
Enzyme activity
EC #	BRENDA	ExPASy	KEGG	MetaCyc
2.3.2.27	↗	↗	↗	↗

Gene location (Human)
Chr.	Chromosome 2 (human)
Band	2p11.2	Start	84,971,093 bp
Band	2p11.2	End	85,059,472 bp

Gene location (Mouse)
Chr.	Chromosome 6 (mouse)
Band	6 C1|6 32.3 cM	Start	72,818,097 bp
Band	6 C1|6 32.3 cM	End	72,876,962 bp
RNA expression pattern
Bgee	Human / Mouse (ortholog); Top expressed in: sperm; parotid gland; amniotic fluid; gingival epithelium; endothelial cell; cartilage tissue; palpebral conjunctiva; epithelium of nasopharynx; mucosa of sigmoid colon; gastrocnemius muscle / Top expressed in: spermatid; lacrimal gland; spermatocyte; triceps brachii muscle; vastus lateralis muscle; temporal muscle; endothelial cell of lymphatic vessel; primary oocyte; sternocleidomastoid muscle; parotid gland; More reference expression data
BioGPS	n/a
Gene ontology
Molecular function	metal ion binding; zinc ion binding; transferase activity; nucleic acid binding; ubiquitin protein ligase activity
Cellular component	extracellular region; ficolin-1-rich granule lumen; cytosol
Biological process	neutrophil degranulation; protein ubiquitination
Sources:Amigo / QuickGO
Orthologs
Databases	NCBI: entry; OMA: entry
Species	Human	Mouse
Entrez	56888	74287
Ensembl	ENSG00000176407	ENSMUSG00000055239
UniProt	Q9P0J7	Q80UY2
RefSeq (mRNA)	NM_020122	NM_019715; NM_001347231
RefSeq (protein)	NP_064507	NP_001334160; NP_062689
Location (UCSC)	Chr 2: 84.97 – 85.06 Mb	Chr 6: 72.82 – 72.88 Mb
PubMed search
- Wikidata
View/Edit Human	View/Edit Mouse

Potassium channel modulatory factor 1 is a protein that in humans is encoded by the KCMF1 gene.
