= HSF5 =

Protein-coding gene in the species Homo sapiens

Identifiers
- Aliases: HSF5, HSF 5, HSTF 5, heat shock transcription factor 5
- External IDs: MGI: 2685585; GeneCards: HSF5

Gene location (Human)
Chr.	Chromosome 17 (human)
Band	17q22	Start	58,420,167 bp
Band	17q22	End	58,488,408 bp

Gene location (Mouse)
Chr.	Chromosome 11 (mouse)
Band	11|11 C	Start	87,507,990 bp
Band	11|11 C	End	87,550,368 bp
RNA expression pattern
Bgee	Human / Mouse (ortholog); Top expressed in: sperm; secondary oocyte; left testis; right testis; gonad; testicle; lymph node; appendix; bone marrow; granulocyte / Top expressed in: spermatocyte; spermatid; seminiferous tubule; zygote; secondary oocyte; primary oocyte; lumbar subsegment of spinal cord; embryo; submandibular gland; temporal muscle; More reference expression data
BioGPS	n/a
Gene ontology
Molecular function	DNA-binding transcription factor activity; sequence-specific DNA binding; DNA binding; DNA-binding transcription factor activity, RNA polymerase II-specific; RNA polymerase II cis-regulatory region sequence-specific DNA binding
Cellular component	nucleus
Biological process	regulation of transcription, DNA-templated; transcription, DNA-templated; regulation of transcription by RNA polymerase II; cellular response to heat; positive regulation of transcription from RNA polymerase II promoter in response to heat stress
Sources:Amigo / QuickGO
Orthologs
Databases	NCBI: entry; OMA: entry
Species	Human	Mouse
Entrez	124535	327992
Ensembl	ENSG00000176160	ENSMUSG00000070345
UniProt	Q4G112	Q5ND04
RefSeq (mRNA)	NM_001080439	NM_001045527
RefSeq (protein)	NP_001073908	NP_001038992
Location (UCSC)	Chr 17: 58.42 – 58.49 Mb	Chr 11: 87.51 – 87.55 Mb
PubMed search
- Wikidata
View/Edit Human	View/Edit Mouse

Heat shock transcription factor 5 is a protein that in humans is encoded by the HSF5 gene.
