= HID1 =

Protein-coding gene in the species Homo sapiens

Identifiers
- Aliases: HID1, C17orf28, DMC1, HID-1, HID1 domain containing, 17orf28
- External IDs: OMIM: 605752; MGI: 2445087; HomoloGene: 12737; GeneCards: HID1; OMA:HID1 - orthologs

Gene location (Human)
Chr.	Chromosome 17 (human)
Band	17q25.1	Start	74,950,742 bp
Band	17q25.1	End	74,973,166 bp

Gene location (Mouse)
Chr.	Chromosome 11 (mouse)
Band	11|11 E2	Start	115,238,533 bp
Band	11|11 E2	End	115,258,582 bp
RNA expression pattern
Bgee	Human / Mouse (ortholog); Top expressed in: right hemisphere of cerebellum; body of pancreas; right frontal lobe; body of stomach; anterior pituitary; Brodmann area 9; C1 segment; right uterine tube; minor salivary glands; hypothalamus / Top expressed in: lacrimal gland; vestibular membrane of cochlear duct; epithelium of stomach; salivary gland; submandibular gland; crypt of lieberkuhn of small intestine; primary visual cortex; islet of Langerhans; superior frontal gyrus; dentate gyrus of hippocampal formation granule cell; More reference expression data
BioGPS	n/a
Gene ontology
Molecular function	protein binding
Cellular component	extracellular exosome; Golgi apparatus; Golgi medial cisterna; cytoplasmic microtubule; Golgi membrane; membrane; cytoplasm; extrinsic component of Golgi membrane; Golgi trans cisterna; cytosol
Biological process	response to brefeldin A; intracellular protein transport
Sources:Amigo / QuickGO
Orthologs
Species	Human	Mouse
Entrez	283987	217310
Ensembl	ENSG00000167861	ENSMUSG00000034586
UniProt	Q8IV36	Q8R1F6
RefSeq (mRNA)	NM_030630	NM_175454; NM_001346774
RefSeq (protein)	NP_085133	NP_001333703; NP_780663
Location (UCSC)	Chr 17: 74.95 – 74.97 Mb	Chr 11: 115.24 – 115.26 Mb
PubMed search
- Wikidata
View/Edit Human	View/Edit Mouse

HID1 domain containing is a protein that in humans is encoded by the HID1 gene.
