= Chromosome 14 =

Human chromosome

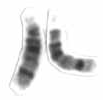
- Human chromosome 14 pair after G-banding. One is from mother, one is from father.

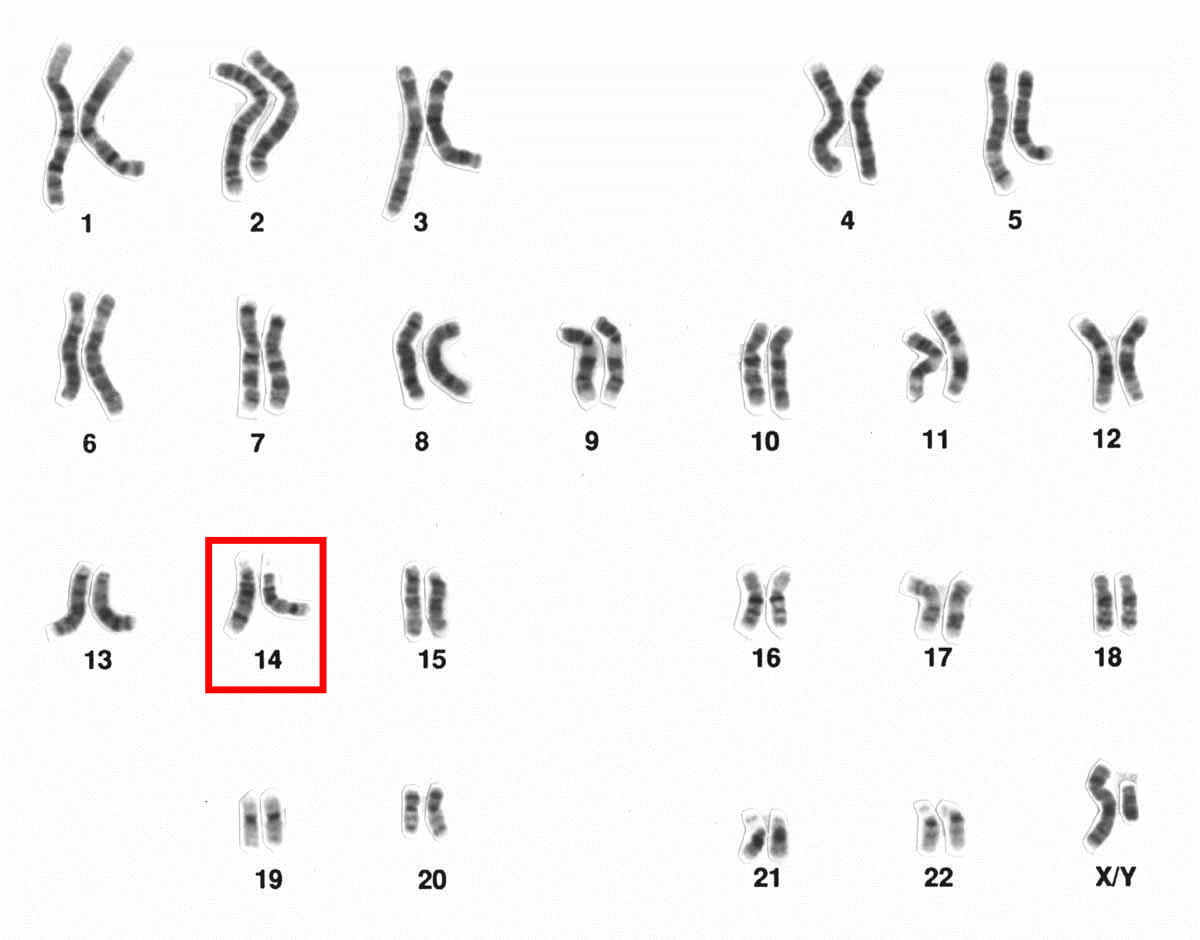
- Chromosome 14 pair in human male karyogram.

Features
- Length (bp): 101,161,492 bp (CHM13)
- No. of genes: 583 (CCDS)
- Type: Autosome
- Centromere position: Acrocentric (17.2 Mbp)

Complete gene lists
- CCDS: Gene list
- HGNC: Gene list
- UniProt: Gene list
- NCBI: Gene list

External map viewers
- Ensembl: Chromosome 14
- Entrez: Chromosome 14
- NCBI: Chromosome 14
- UCSC: Chromosome 14

Full DNA sequences
- RefSeq: NC_000014 (FASTA)
- GenBank: CM000676 (FASTA)

Chromosome 14 is one of the 23 pairs of chromosomes in humans. People normally have two copies of this chromosome. Chromosome 14 spans about 107 million base pairs (the building material of DNA) and represents between 3 and 3.5% of the total DNA in cells.

The centromere of chromosome 14 is positioned approximately at position 17.2 Mbp.

== Genes ==
=== Number of genes ===
The following are some of the gene count estimates of human chromosome 14. Because researchers use different approaches to genome annotation their predictions of the number of genes on each chromosome varies (for technical details, see gene prediction). Among various projects, the collaborative consensus coding sequence project (CCDS) takes an extremely conservative strategy. So CCDS's gene number prediction represents a lower bound on the total number of human protein-coding genes.

Estimated by	Protein-coding genes	Non-coding RNA genes	Pseudogenes	Source	Release date
CCDS	583	—	—		2016-09-08
HGNC	593	324	513		2017-05-12
Ensembl	820	856	518		2017-03-29
UniProt	720	—	—		2018-02-28
NCBI	621	690	598		2017-05-19

=== Gene list ===
The following is a partial list of genes on human chromosome 14. For complete list, see the link in the infobox on the right.

- ACIN1: encoding protein Apoptotic chromatin condensation inducer in the nucleus
- AHNAK2: encoding protein Ahnak nucleoprotein 2
- ATXN3: Ataxin-3 (Machado-Joseph disease)
- BCL2L2: encoding the anti-apoptotic protein Bcl-w of the Bcl-2 family
- C14orf80: encoding protein C14orf80
- C14orf93: encoding protein C14orf93
- CCDC176: encoding protein Basal body-orientation factor 1
- CCDC88C: encoding protein Coiled-coil domain containing 88C
- CDC42BPB: encoding protein CDC42 binding protein kinase beta
- CDKL1: encoding protein Cyclin dependent kinase like 1
- CHMP4A: Charged multivesicular body protein 4a
- CIDEB: Cell death-inducing DFFA-like effector b
- CLBA1: encoding protein CLBA1
- CMA1: encoding enzyme Chymase
- CNIH: encoding protein Protein cornichon homolog
- COCH: coagulation factor C homolog, cochlin (Limulus polyphemus)
- CRIP2: Cysteine-rich protein 2
- DDX24: encoding enzyme ATP-dependent RNA helicase DDX24
- DEGS2: encoding protein Delta(4)-desaturase, sphingolipid 2
- DLGAP5: Disks large-associated protein 5
- DGLUCY: encoding protein DGLUCY, mitochondrial
- EAPP: E2F-associated phosphoprotein
- EGLN3: Egl nine homolog 3
- ENTPD5: Ectonucleoside triphosphate diphosphohydrolase 5
- ERG28: encoding protein Probable ergosterol biosynthetic protein 28
- Fam158a: encoding protein UPF0172 protein FAM158A
- FAM181A: encoding protein Family with sequence similarity 181, member A
- FAM71D: Family With Sequence Similarity 71, Member D
- FCF1: rRNA-processing protein FCF1 homolog
- FSCB: encoding protein Fibrous sheath CABYR binding protein
- GALC: galactosylceramidase (Krabbe disease)
- GARNL1: GTPase-activating Rap/Ran-GAP domain-like 1
- GCH1: GTP cyclohydrolase 1 (dopa-responsive dystonia)
- GPHB5: Glycoprotein hormone beta-5
- GSKIP encoding protein GSK3B interacting protein
- HHIPL1: encoding protein HHIP-like protein 1
- IFI27: encoding protein Interferon alpha-inducible protein 27
- IFT43: intraflagellar transport 43
- IGH@: immunoglobulin heavy chain locus
- IRF2BPL: encoding protein Interferon regulatory factor 2 binding protein like
- ITPK1: encoding enzyme Inositol-tetrakisphosphate 1-kinase
- JKAMP: encoding protein JNK1-associated membrane protein
- JPH4: encoding protein Junctophilin 4
- LINC00520: a long non-coding RNA
- LINC00637: encoding protein Long intergenic non-protein coding RNA 637
- LYSET: lysosomal enzyme trafficking factor
- MAPK1IP1L: encoding protein MAPK-interacting and spindle-stabilizing protein-like
- MIA2: encoding protein Melanoma inhibitory activity protein 2
- MIR494 encoding protein MicroRNA 494
- MIR495: encoding protein MicroRNA 495
- MIR3173: encoding protein MicroRNA 3173
- MIS18BP1: encoding protein MIS18 binding protein 1
- MOAP1: encoding protein Modulator of apoptosis 1
- MYH7: myosin heavy chain beta (MHC-β) isoform
- NEMF (gene): encoding protein Nuclear export mediator factor
- NPC2: Niemann-Pick disease, type C2
- NUBPL: encoding protein Iron-sulfur protein NUBPL (IND1)
- OSGEP: encoding enzyme Probable O-sialoglycoprotein endopeptidase
- PAPOLA: encoding enzyme Poly(A) polymerase alpha
- PCNX: encoding protein Pecanex-like protein 1
- PELI2: encoding protein Protein pellino homolog 2
- PLEKHG3: encoding protein Pleckstrin homology and rhogef domain containing g3
- PSEN1: presenilin 1 (Alzheimer disease 3)
- RIOX1: encoding protein RIOX1
- RTRAF: encoding protein RTRAF
- RPL10L: encoding protein 60S ribosomal protein L10-like
- SERPINA1: serpin peptidase inhibitor, clade A (alpha-1 antiproteinase, antitrypsin), member 1
- SERPINA3: encoding protein alpha-1-antichymotrypsin (ACT)
- SERPINA12: encoding protein SERPIN A12
- SIX6OS1: encoding protein SIX6OS1
- SGPP1: encoding enzyme Sphingosine-1-phosphate phosphatase 1
- SNORD9: encoding protein Small nucleolar rna, c/d box 9
- SYNE3: encoding protein Spectrin repeat containing nuclear envelope family member
- TC2N: encoding protein Tandem C2 domains nuclear protein
- TCL1B: encoding protein T-cell leukemia/lymphoma protein 1B
- TIMM9: encoding enzyme Mitochondrial import inner membrane translocase subunit Tim9
- TMED10: encoding protein Transmembrane emp24 domain-containing protein 10
- TMEM260: encoding protein TMEM260
- TRAJ56: encoding protein T cell receptor alpha joining 56
- TRAV12-2: encoding protein T cell receptor alpha variable 12-2
- TSHR: thyroid stimulating hormone receptor
- TUNAR: a long non-coding RNA
- VASH1: encoding protein Vasohibin-1
- VIPAS39: encoding protein VIPAS39
- WARS: encoding enzyme Tryptophanyl-tRNA synthetase, cytoplasmic
- YLPM1: encoding protein YLP motif-containing protein 1
- ZBTB1: encoding protein Zinc finger and BTB domain containing 1
- ZFHX2: encoding protein Zinc finger homeobox 2
- ZNF839: encoding protein Zinc finger protein 839

== Diseases and disorders ==
The following diseases are some of those related to genes on chromosome 14:

- Alpha-1 antitrypsin deficiency
- Alzheimer's disease
- Burkitt's lymphoma (t8;14)
- congenital hypothyroidism
- dopamine-responsive dystonia
- Follicular lymphoma (t14;18)
- FOXG1 syndrome
- Hypertrophic cardiomyopathy
- Krabbe disease
- Cranio-lenticulo-sutural dysplasia
- Machado-Joseph disease
- Mosaic monosomy 14
- Multiple myeloma
- Niemann-Pick disease
- Nonsyndromic deafness
- Sensenbrenner syndrome
- Tetrahydrobiopterin deficiency
- Kagami-Ogata Syndrome
- Temple Syndrome
- Oculopharyngeal muscular dystrophy

== Cytogenetic band ==
G-banding ideograms of human chromosome 14

G-banding ideogram of human chromosome 14 in resolution 850 bphs. Band length in this diagram is proportional to base-pair length. This type of ideogram is generally used in genome browsers (e.g. Ensembl, UCSC Genome Browser).

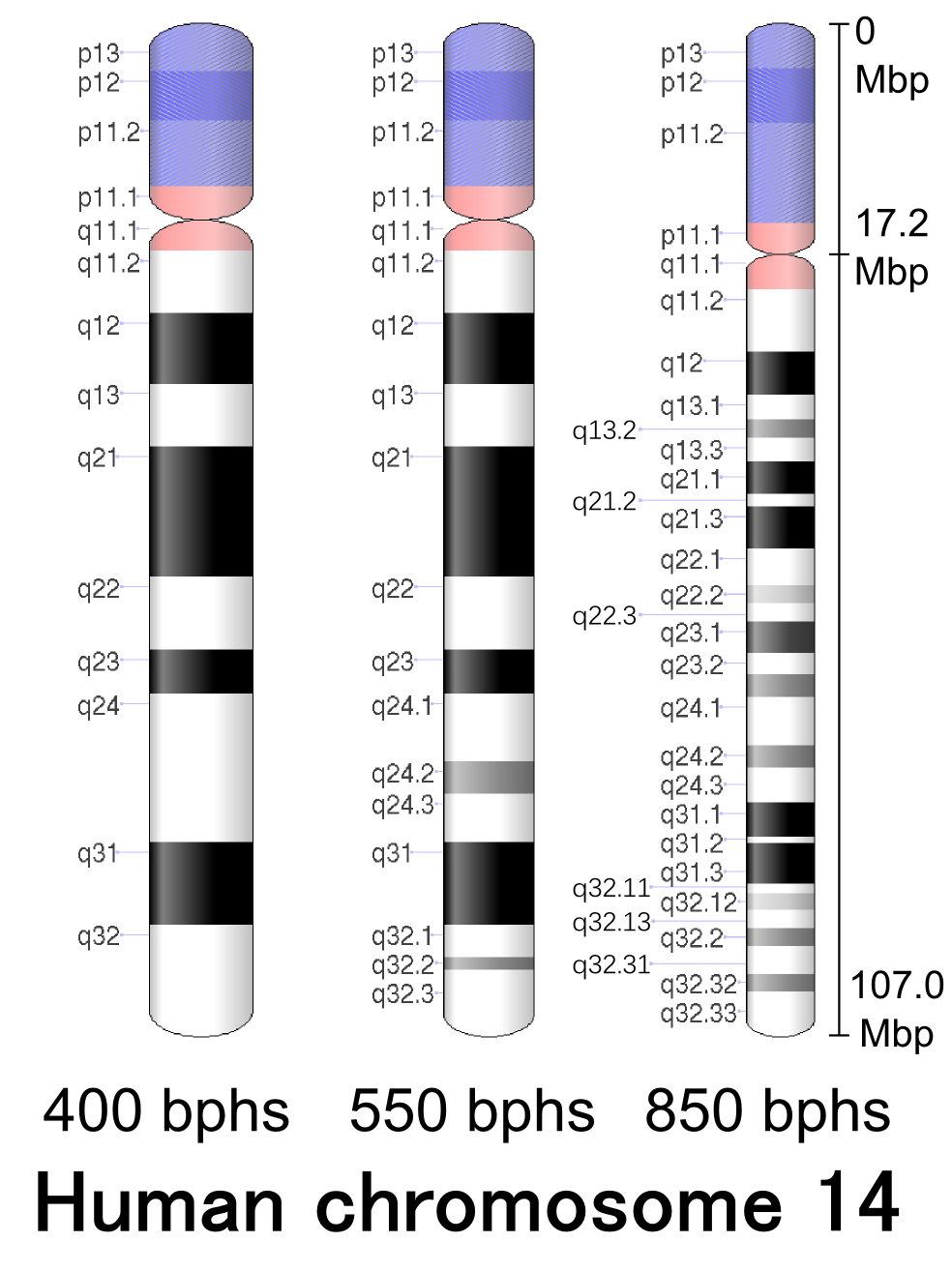
G-banding patterns of human chromosome 14 in three different resolutions (400, 550 and 850). Band length in this diagram is based on the ideograms from ISCN (2013). This type of ideogram represents actual relative band length observed under a microscope at the different moments during the mitotic process.

G-bands of human chromosome 14 in resolution 850 bphs
Chr.	Arm	Band	ISCN start	ISCN stop	Basepair start	Basepair stop	Stain	Density
14	p	13	0	284	1	3,600,000	gvar	
14	p	12	284	624	3,600,001	8,000,000	stalk	
14	p	11.2	624	1249	8,000,001	16,100,000	gvar	
14	p	11.1	1249	1433	16,100,001	17,200,000	acen	
14	q	11.1	1433	1660	17,200,001	18,200,000	acen	
14	q	11.2	1660	2043	18,200,001	24,100,000	gneg	
14	q	12	2043	2313	24,100,001	32,900,000	gpos	100
14	q	13.1	2313	2469	32,900,001	34,800,000	gneg	
14	q	13.2	2469	2582	34,800,001	36,100,000	gpos	50
14	q	13.3	2582	2724	36,100,001	37,400,000	gneg	
14	q	21.1	2724	2923	37,400,001	43,000,000	gpos	100
14	q	21.2	2923	3008	43,000,001	46,700,000	gneg	
14	q	21.3	3008	3264	46,700,001	50,400,000	gpos	100
14	q	22.1	3264	3491	50,400,001	53,600,000	gneg	
14	q	22.2	3491	3604	53,600,001	55,000,000	gpos	25
14	q	22.3	3604	3718	55,000,001	57,600,000	gneg	
14	q	23.1	3718	3916	57,600,001	61,600,000	gpos	75
14	q	23.2	3916	4044	61,600,001	64,300,000	gneg	
14	q	23.3	4044	4186	64,300,001	67,400,000	gpos	50
14	q	24.1	4186	4484	67,400,001	69,800,000	gneg	
14	q	24.2	4484	4626	69,800,001	73,300,000	gpos	50
14	q	24.3	4626	4839	73,300,001	78,800,000	gneg	
14	q	31.1	4839	5051	78,800,001	83,100,000	gpos	100
14	q	31.2	5051	5094	83,100,001	84,400,000	gneg	
14	q	31.3	5094	5349	84,400,001	89,300,000	gpos	100
14	q	32.11	5349	5406	89,300,001	91,400,000	gneg	
14	q	32.12	5406	5505	91,400,001	94,200,000	gpos	25
14	q	32.13	5505	5619	94,200,001	95,800,000	gneg	
14	q	32.2	5619	5732	95,800,001	100,900,000	gpos	50
14	q	32.31	5732	5903	100,900,001	102,700,000	gneg	
14	q	32.32	5903	6016	102,700,001	103,500,000	gpos	50
14	q	32.33	6016	6300	103,500,001	107,043,718	gneg	
