= RALGAPA1 =

Protein-coding gene in humans

Identifiers
- Aliases: RALGAPA1, GARNL1, GRIPE, RalGAPalpha1, TULIP1, p240, Ral GTPase activating protein catalytic alpha subunit 1, Ral GTPase activating protein catalytic subunit alpha 1, NEDHRIT
- External IDs: OMIM: 608884; MGI: 1931050; GeneCards: RALGAPA1

Gene location (Human)
Chr.	Chromosome 14 (human)
Band	14q13.2	Start	35,538,352 bp
Band	14q13.2	End	35,809,304 bp

Gene location (Mouse)
Chr.	Chromosome 12 (mouse)
Band	12|12 C1	Start	55,602,896 bp
Band	12|12 C1	End	55,821,167 bp
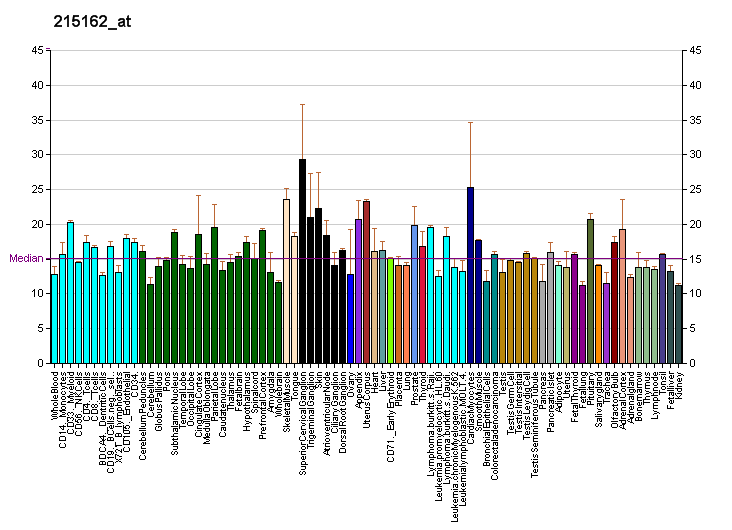

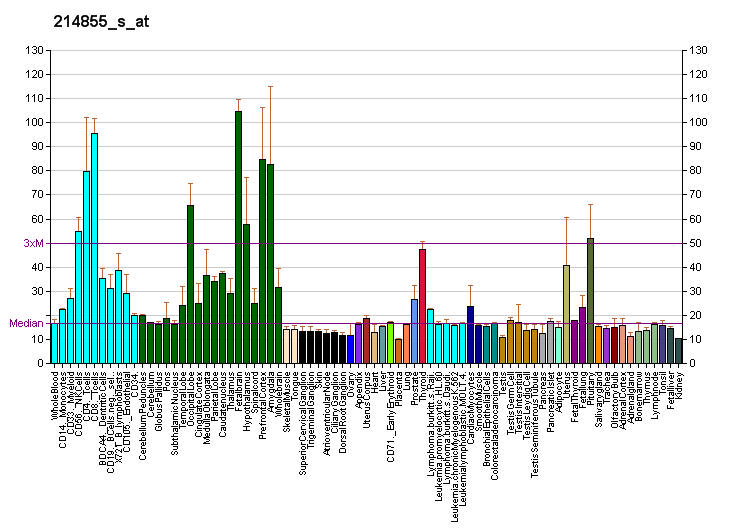

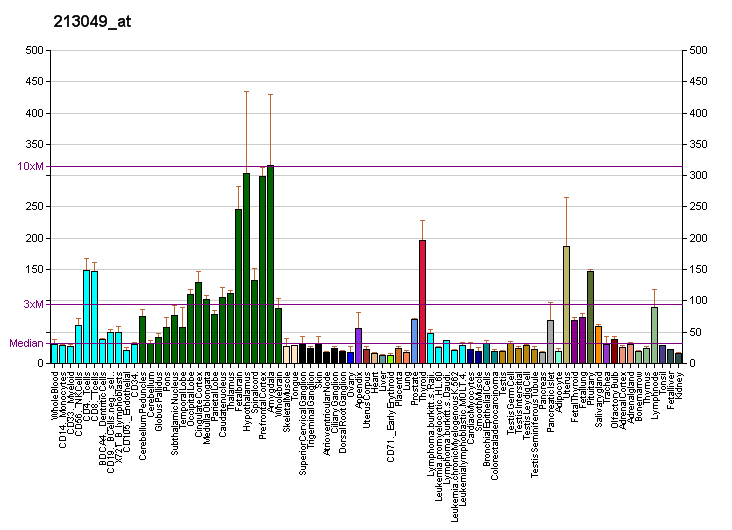
RNA expression pattern
Bgee	Human / Mouse (ortholog); Top expressed in: endothelial cell; Achilles tendon; corpus callosum; lateral nuclear group of thalamus; sural nerve; inferior olivary nucleus; dorsal motor nucleus of vagus nerve; pars compacta; Epithelium of choroid plexus; external globus pallidus / Top expressed in: ascending aorta; visual cortex; primary visual cortex; aortic valve; superior frontal gyrus; cerebellar cortex; primary motor cortex; granulocyte; medial dorsal nucleus; mammillary body; More reference expression data
BioGPS	More reference expression data
Gene ontology
Molecular function	GTPase activator activity; protein heterodimerization activity
Cellular component	cytoplasm; nucleus
Biological process	regulation of small GTPase mediated signal transduction; activation of GTPase activity; positive regulation of GTPase activity
Sources:Amigo / QuickGO
Orthologs
Databases	NCBI: entry; OMA: entry
Species	Human	Mouse
Entrez	253959	56784
Ensembl	ENSG00000174373	ENSMUSG00000021027
UniProt	Q6GYQ0	Q6GYP7
RefSeq (mRNA)	NM_001283043; NM_001283044; NM_014990; NM_194301; NM_001330075 NM_001346243; NM_001346245; NM_001346246; NM_001346247; NM_001346248; NM_001346249	NM_001003719; NM_001112714; NM_001286263; NM_019994; NM_001368814
RefSeq (protein)	NP_001269972; NP_001269973; NP_001317004; NP_001333172; NP_001333174 NP_001333175; NP_001333176; NP_001333177; NP_001333178; NP_055805; NP_919277	NP_001003719; NP_001106185; NP_001273192; NP_064378; NP_001355743
Location (UCSC)	Chr 14: 35.54 – 35.81 Mb	Chr 12: 55.6 – 55.82 Mb
PubMed search
- Wikidata
View/Edit Human	View/Edit Mouse

Ral GTPase-activating protein subunit alpha-1 is an enzyme that in humans is encoded by the RALGAPA1 gene. This protein binds to the RALGAPB protein to form a protein complex called "RalGAP1". This complex functions as an activator for the small GTPases RALA and RALB. RALGAPA1 is the catalytic subunit for RalGAP1.
