= SIX6OS1 =

Protein-coding gene in the species Homo sapiens

C14orf39

Identifiers
- Aliases: C14orf39, Six6os1, chromosome 14 open reading frame 39, SPGF52, POF18
- External IDs: OMIM: 617307; MGI: 1923051; HomoloGene: 49922; GeneCards: C14orf39; OMA:C14orf39 - orthologs

Gene location (Human)
Chr.	Chromosome 14 (human)
Band	14q23.1	Start	60,396,469 bp
Band	14q23.1	End	60,515,543 bp

Gene location (Mouse)
Chr.	Chromosome 12 (mouse)
Band	12|12 C3	Start	72,927,883 bp
Band	12|12 C3	End	72,987,548 bp
RNA expression pattern
Bgee	Human / Mouse (ortholog); Top expressed in: gonad; testicle; anterior pituitary; Achilles tendon; right testis; left testis; muscle of thigh; gastrocnemius muscle; secondary oocyte; mucosa of paranasal sinus / Top expressed in: neural layer of retina; spermatocyte; lumbar spinal ganglion; pituitary gland; pineal gland; spermatid; median eminence; superior frontal gyrus; arcuate nucleus; embryo; More reference expression data
BioGPS	n/a
Gene ontology
Molecular function	molecular function
Cellular component	central element; chromosome; cellular component
Biological process	multicellular organism development; regulation of DNA-binding transcription factor activity; DNA recombination; homologous chromosome pairing at meiosis; spermatogenesis; meiotic DNA double-strand break processing involved in reciprocal meiotic recombination; oogenesis; meiosis
Sources:Amigo / QuickGO
Orthologs
Species	Human	Mouse
Entrez	317761	75801
Ensembl	ENSG00000179008	ENSMUSG00000021098
UniProt	Q8N1H7	Q9CTN5
RefSeq (mRNA)	NM_174978	NM_029444
RefSeq (protein)	NP_777638	NP_083720
Location (UCSC)	Chr 14: 60.4 – 60.52 Mb	Chr 12: 72.93 – 72.99 Mb
PubMed search
- Wikidata
View/Edit Human	View/Edit Mouse

Chromosome 14 open reading frame 39, abbreviated C14orf39, and also known as Six6os1, is a protein that in humans is encoded by the SIX6OS1 gene.
