= MOAP1 =

Protein-coding gene in the species Homo sapiens

Identifiers
- Aliases: MOAP1, MAP-1, PNMA4, modulator of apoptosis 1
- External IDs: OMIM: 609485; MGI: 1915555; GeneCards: MOAP1

Gene location (Human)
| Chr. | Chromosome 14 (human) |
| Band | 14q32.12 | Start | 93,182,199 bp |
| Band | 14q32.12 | End | 93,184,923 bp |

Gene location (Mouse)
| Chr. | Chromosome 12 (mouse) |
| Band | 12|12 E | Start | 102,708,489 bp |
| Band | 12|12 E | End | 102,709,920 bp |
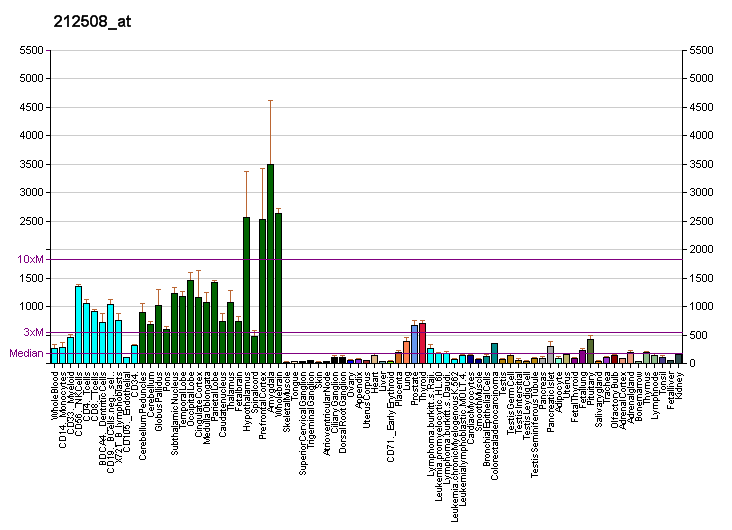
RNA expression pattern
| Bgee | Human / Mouse (ortholog); Top expressed in: superior frontal gyrus; prefrontal cortex; Brodmann area 9; primary visual cortex; right frontal lobe; hypothalamus; anterior cingulate cortex; cerebellum; cerebellar cortex; cerebellar hemisphere / Top expressed in: spermatocyte; spermatid; neural tube; testicle; mesencephalon; hypothalamus; dentate gyrus of hippocampal formation granule cell; tail of embryo; ganglionic eminence; Cortex of frontal lobe; More reference expression data |
| BioGPS | More reference expression data |
Gene ontology
| Molecular function | protein binding; ubiquitin protein ligase binding |
| Cellular component | cytoplasm; mitochondrial outer membrane; cytosol; mitochondrion |
| Biological process | apoptotic process; apoptotic signaling pathway; positive regulation of release of cytochrome c from mitochondria; protein insertion into mitochondrial membrane involved in apoptotic signaling pathway; extrinsic apoptotic signaling pathway via death domain receptors; intrinsic apoptotic signaling pathway in response to DNA damage; extrinsic apoptotic signaling pathway in absence of ligand; positive regulation of apoptotic process |
Sources:Amigo / QuickGO
Orthologs
| Databases | NCBI: entry; OMA: entry |
| Species | Human | Mouse |
| Entrez | 64112 | 64113 |
| Ensembl | ENSG00000165943; ENSG00000278268 | ENSMUSG00000096458 |
| UniProt | Q96BY2 | Q9ERH6 |
| RefSeq (mRNA) | NM_022151 | NM_001142937; NM_022323 |
| RefSeq (protein) | NP_071434 | NP_001136409; NP_071718 |
| Location (UCSC) | Chr 14: 93.18 – 93.18 Mb | Chr 12: 102.71 – 102.71 Mb |
| PubMed search |
- Wikidata
| View/Edit Human | View/Edit Mouse |

Modulator of apoptosis 1 is a protein that in humans is encoded by the MOAP1 gene.

The protein encoded by this gene was identified by its interaction with apoptosis regulator BAX protein. This protein contains a Bcl-2 homology 3 (BH3)-like motif, which is required for the association with BAX. When overexpressed, this gene has been shown to mediate caspase-dependent apoptosis.
