= TRAV12-2 =

Gene in the species Homo sapiens

Identifiers
- Aliases: TRAV12-2, TCRAV12S2, TCRAV2S1, T cell receptor alpha variable 12-2
- External IDs: GeneCards: TRAV12-2; OMA:TRAV12-2 - orthologs

Gene location (Human)
Chr.	Chromosome 14 (human)
Band	14q11.2	Start	21,887,857 bp
Band	14q11.2	End	21,888,502 bp
RNA expression pattern
Bgee	Human / Mouse (ortholog); Top expressed in: granulocyte; lymph node; appendix; blood; spleen; rectum; mucosa of transverse colon; gallbladder; tonsil; right lung / n/a; More reference expression data
BioGPS	n/a
Orthologs
Species	Human	Mouse
Entrez	28673	n/a
Ensembl	ENSG00000211789	n/a
UniProt	n a	n/a
RefSeq (mRNA)	n/a	n/a
RefSeq (protein)	n/a	n/a
Location (UCSC)	Chr 14: 21.89 – 21.89 Mb	n/a
PubMed search		n/a
- Wikidata
View/Edit Human

T cell receptor alpha variable 12-2 is a protein that in humans is encoded by the TRAV12-2 gene.
