= PCNX =

Protein-coding gene in the species Homo sapiens

PCNX1

Identifiers
- Aliases: PCNX1, PCNXL1, pecanex, PCNX, pecanex homolog 1 (Drosophila), pecanex homolog 1, pecanex 1
- External IDs: OMIM: 617655; MGI: 1891924; GeneCards: PCNX1

Gene location (Human)
Chr.	Chromosome 14 (human)
Band	14q24.2	Start	70,907,405 bp
Band	14q24.2	End	71,115,382 bp

Gene location (Mouse)
Chr.	Chromosome 12 (mouse)
Band	12|12 D1	Start	81,906,797 bp
Band	12|12 D1	End	82,047,698 bp
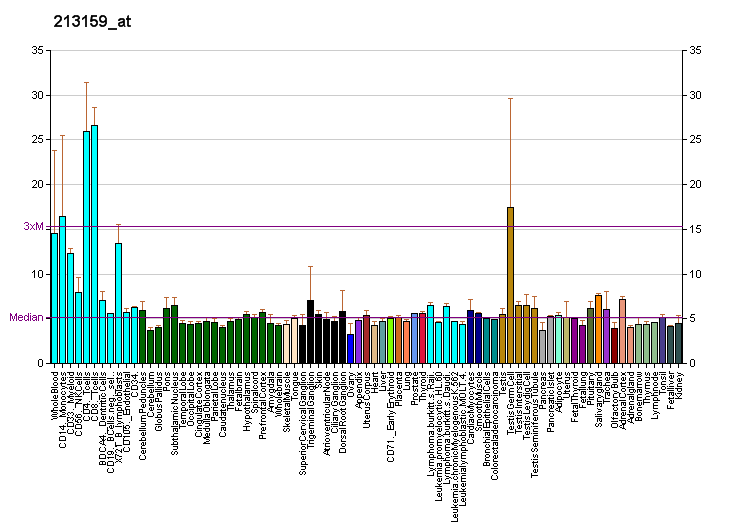

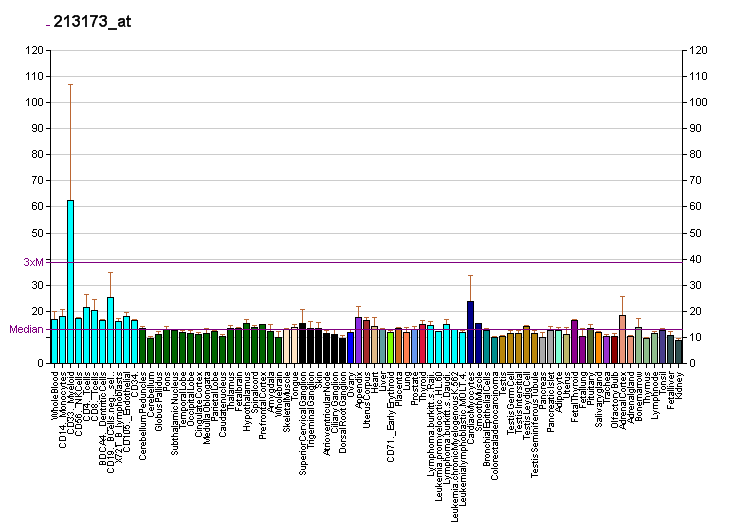
RNA expression pattern
Bgee	Human / Mouse (ortholog); Top expressed in: epithelium of colon; Brodmann area 23; sural nerve; middle temporal gyrus; Achilles tendon; ventricular zone; parietal pleura; blood; Skeletal muscle tissue of rectus abdominis; visceral pleura / Top expressed in: dentate gyrus of hippocampal formation granule cell; Epithelium of choroid plexus; epithelium of lens; retinal pigment epithelium; spermatocyte; spermatid; neural layer of retina; temporal muscle; granulocyte; sternocleidomastoid muscle; More reference expression data
BioGPS	More reference expression data
Orthologs
Databases	NCBI: entry; OMA: entry
Species	Human	Mouse
Entrez	22990	54604
Ensembl	ENSG00000100731	ENSMUSG00000021140
UniProt	Q96RV3	Q9QYC1
RefSeq (mRNA)	NM_001308160; NM_014982	NM_018814
RefSeq (protein)	NP_001295089; NP_055797	NP_061284
Location (UCSC)	Chr 14: 70.91 – 71.12 Mb	Chr 12: 81.91 – 82.05 Mb
PubMed search
- Wikidata
View/Edit Human	View/Edit Mouse

Pecanex-like protein 1 is a protein that in humans is encoded by the PCNX1 gene (previously PCNX). The gene is found in Homo sapiens, and functions as a competitive endogenous RNA of S-phase kinase associated protein 2 in lung cancer.
