= TCL1B =

Protein-coding gene in the species Homo sapiens

Identifiers
- Aliases: TCL1B, SYN-1, TML1, T-cell leukemia/lymphoma 1B, T cell leukemia/lymphoma 1B, TCL1 family AKT coactivator B
- External IDs: OMIM: 603769; HomoloGene: 81735; GeneCards: TCL1B; OMA:TCL1B - orthologs

Gene location (Human)
Chr.	Chromosome 14 (human)
Band	14q32.13	Start	95,686,426 bp
Band	14q32.13	End	95,692,628 bp
RNA expression pattern
Bgee	Human / Mouse (ortholog); Top expressed in: testicle; gonad; granulocyte; lymph node; placenta; left testis; tonsil; right testis; spleen; blood / n/a; More reference expression data
BioGPS	n/a
Gene ontology
Molecular function	protein kinase binding; protein serine/threonine kinase activator activity
Cellular component	protein-containing complex
Biological process	positive regulation of peptidyl-serine phosphorylation; positive regulation of protein serine/threonine kinase activity; positive regulation of cell population proliferation
Sources:Amigo / QuickGO
Orthologs
Species	Human	Mouse
Entrez	9623	n/a
Ensembl	ENSG00000213231	n/a
UniProt	O95988	n/a
RefSeq (mRNA)	NM_199206; NM_004918	n/a
RefSeq (protein)	NP_004909	n/a
Location (UCSC)	Chr 14: 95.69 – 95.69 Mb	n/a
PubMed search		n/a
- Wikidata
View/Edit Human

T-cell leukemia/lymphoma protein 1B is a protein that in humans is encoded by the TCL1B gene.
