= AHNAK2 =

Protein-coding gene in humans

Identifiers
- Aliases: AHNAK2, C14orf78, AHNAK nucleoprotein 2
- External IDs: OMIM: 608570; MGI: 2144831; GeneCards: AHNAK2
Available structures
PDB	Human UniProt search: PDBe RCSB
PDB	List of PDB id codes 4CN0

Gene location (Human)
Chr.	Chromosome 14 (human)
Band	14q32.33	Start	104,937,244 bp
Band	14q32.33	End	104,978,374 bp

Gene location (Mouse)
Chr.	Chromosome 12 (mouse)
Band	12|12 F1	Start	112,772,194 bp
Band	12|12 F1	End	112,802,657 bp
RNA expression pattern
Bgee	Human / Mouse (ortholog); Top expressed in: tendon of biceps brachii; skin of thigh; gingival epithelium; skin of hip; nipple; spinal ganglia; skin of abdomen; gastric mucosa; skin of arm; vulva / Top expressed in: facial motor nucleus; iris; skin of external ear; endothelial cell of lymphatic vessel; lip; conjunctival fornix; sciatic nerve; umbilical cord; decidua; stroma of bone marrow; More reference expression data
BioGPS	n/a
Gene ontology
Molecular function	protein binding
Cellular component	plasma membrane; sarcolemma; nucleus; cytoplasmic vesicle membrane; costamere; T-tubule; Z discdkac; cytoplasm; cytosol
Biological process	plasma membrane repair; regulation of RNA splicing
Sources:Amigo / QuickGO
Orthologs
Databases	NCBI: entry; OMA: entry
Species	Human	Mouse
Entrez	113146	100041194
Ensembl	ENSG00000185567	ENSMUSG00000072812
UniProt	Q8IVF2	n/a
RefSeq (mRNA)	NM_138420; NM_001350929	NM_001033476
RefSeq (protein)	NP_612429; NP_001337858	n/a
Location (UCSC)	Chr 14: 104.94 – 104.98 Mb	Chr 12: 112.77 – 112.8 Mb
PubMed search
- Wikidata
View/Edit Human	View/Edit Mouse

AHNAK nucleoprotein 2 is a protein that in humans is encoded by the AHNAK2 gene.
