= EAPP =

Protein-coding gene in the species Homo sapiens

Identifiers
- Aliases: EAPP, BM036, C14orf11, E2F associated phosphoprotein
- External IDs: OMIM: 609486; MGI: 1913516; HomoloGene: 10206; GeneCards: EAPP; OMA:EAPP - orthologs

Gene location (Human)
Chr.	Chromosome 14 (human)
Band	14q13.1	Start	34,515,938 bp
Band	14q13.1	End	34,539,704 bp

Gene location (Mouse)
Chr.	Chromosome 12 (mouse)
Band	12|12 C1	Start	54,717,125 bp
Band	12|12 C1	End	54,742,682 bp
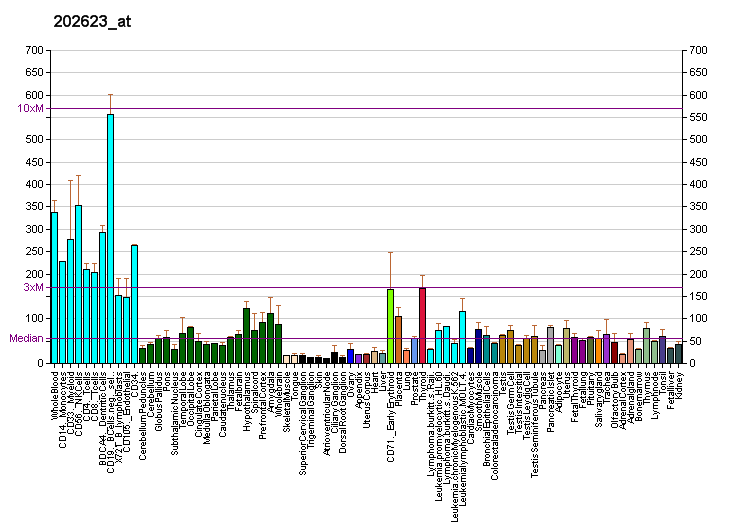
RNA expression pattern
Bgee	Human / Mouse (ortholog); Top expressed in: Achilles tendon; palpebral conjunctiva; olfactory zone of nasal mucosa; rectum; mucosa of transverse colon; skin of leg; left ovary; skin of abdomen; white blood cell; ganglionic eminence / Top expressed in: interventricular septum; yolk sac; medial ganglionic eminence; morula; seminiferous tubule; otic placode; epithelium of lens; granulocyte; neural tube; otic vesicle; More reference expression data
BioGPS	More reference expression data
Orthologs
Species	Human	Mouse
Entrez	55837	66266
Ensembl	ENSG00000129518	ENSMUSG00000054302
UniProt	Q56P03	Q5BU09
RefSeq (mRNA)	NM_018453; NM_001318916	NM_025456; NM_001331162
RefSeq (protein)	NP_001305845; NP_060923	NP_001318091; NP_079732
Location (UCSC)	Chr 14: 34.52 – 34.54 Mb	Chr 12: 54.72 – 54.74 Mb
PubMed search
- Wikidata
View/Edit Human	View/Edit Mouse

E2F-associated phosphoprotein is a protein that in humans is encoded by the EAPP gene.

This gene encodes a phosphoprotein that interacts with several members of the E2F family of proteins. The protein localizes to the nucleus, and is present throughout the cell cycle except during mitosis. It functions to modulate E2F-regulated transcription and stimulate proliferation.
