= FSCB =

Protein-coding gene in the species Homo sapiens

Identifiers
- Aliases: FSCB, C14orf155, fibrous sheath CABYR binding protein
- External IDs: OMIM: 611779; MGI: 3646964; GeneCards: FSCB

Gene location (Human)
Chr.	Chromosome 14 (human)
Band	14q21.2	Start	44,504,149 bp
Band	14q21.2	End	44,507,283 bp

Gene location (Mouse)
Chr.	Chromosome 12 (mouse)
Band	12|12 C1	Start	64,518,104 bp
Band	12|12 C1	End	64,521,464 bp
RNA expression pattern
Bgee	Human / Mouse (ortholog); Top expressed in: sperm; testicle; left testis; right testis; human musculoskeletal system; muscular system; muscle; skeletal muscle; lower limb muscles; muscle of leg / Top expressed in: spermatid; testicle; spermatocyte; secondary oocyte; primary oocyte; islet of Langerhans; More reference expression data
BioGPS	n/a
Orthologs
Databases	NCBI: entry; OMA: entry
Species	Human	Mouse
Entrez	84075	623046
Ensembl	ENSG00000189139	ENSMUSG00000043060
UniProt	Q5H9T9	A1EGX6; E9QJV1
RefSeq (mRNA)	NM_032135	NM_001163271
RefSeq (protein)	NP_115511	NP_001156743
Location (UCSC)	Chr 14: 44.5 – 44.51 Mb	Chr 12: 64.52 – 64.52 Mb
PubMed search
- Wikidata
View/Edit Human	View/Edit Mouse

Fibrous sheath CABYR binding protein is a protein that in humans is encoded by the FSCB gene, which is found on chromosome 14. It is found in Homo sapiens, and has the following lineage: Eukaryota; Metazoa; Chordata; Craniata; Vertebrata; Euteleostomi; Mammalia; Eutheria; Euarchontoglires; Primates; Haplorrhini; Catarrhini; Hominidae; Homo. The sub-cellular function of the protein is to localize to the cortex of the fibrous sheath, including the surface of the longitudinal columns and ribs of the main part of sperm flagella.
