= ITPK1 =

Protein-coding gene in the species Homo sapiens

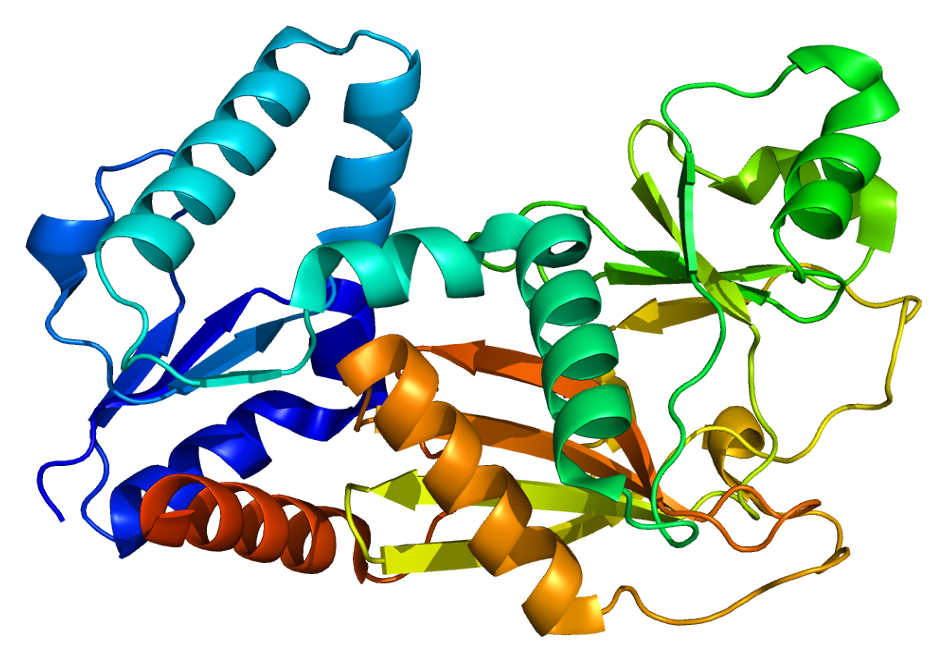

Identifiers
- Aliases: ITPK1, ITRPK1, inositol-tetrakisphosphate 1-kinase
- External IDs: OMIM: 601838; MGI: 2446159; GeneCards: ITPK1
Available structures
PDB	Ortholog search: PDBe RCSB
PDB	List of PDB id codes 2Q7D, 2ODT, 2QB5
Enzyme activity
EC #	BRENDA	ExPASy	KEGG	MetaCyc
2.7.1.134	↗	↗	↗	↗
2.7.1.159	↗	↗	↗	↗

Gene location (Human)
Chr.	Chromosome 14 (human)
Band	14q32.12	Start	92,936,914 bp
Band	14q32.12	End	93,116,320 bp

Gene location (Mouse)
Chr.	Chromosome 12 (mouse)
Band	12|12 E	Start	102,534,841 bp
Band	12|12 E	End	102,671,189 bp
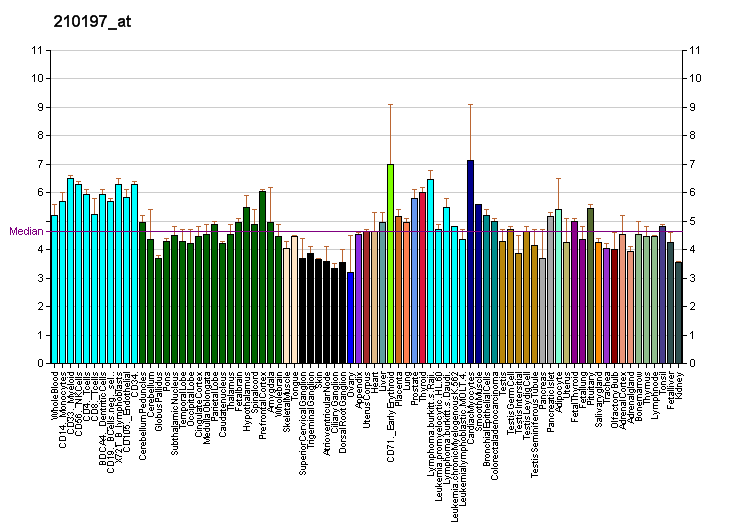

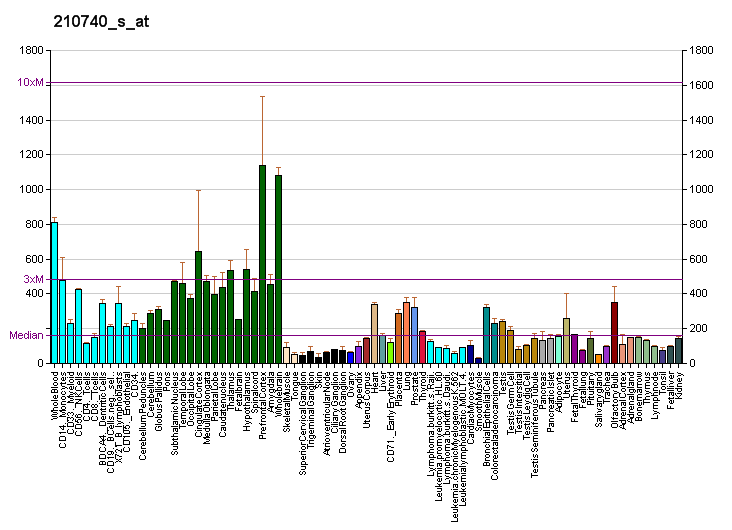
RNA expression pattern
Bgee	Human / Mouse (ortholog); Top expressed in: C1 segment; right frontal lobe; anterior cingulate cortex; prefrontal cortex; amygdala; nucleus accumbens; sural nerve; Brodmann area 9; right coronary artery; caudate nucleus / Top expressed in: gastrula; choroid plexus of fourth ventricle; decidua; crypt of lieberkuhn of small intestine; intestinal villus; ileum; duodenum; jejunum; epithelium of small intestine; CA3 field; More reference expression data
BioGPS	More reference expression data
Gene ontology
Molecular function	transferase activity; nucleotide binding; isomerase activity; metal ion binding; kinase activity; inositol-1,3,4,5,6-pentakisphosphate 1-phosphatase activity; catalytic activity; inositol-1,3,4,6-tetrakisphosphate 6-phosphatase activity; inositol-1,3,4,6-tetrakisphosphate 1-phosphatase activity; inositol-3,4,6-trisphosphate 1-kinase activity; ATP binding; hydrolase activity; magnesium ion binding; inositol-1,3,4-trisphosphate 6-kinase activity; inositol-1,3,4,5-tetrakisphosphate 5-phosphatase activity; inositol-1,3,4-trisphosphate 5-kinase activity; inositol tetrakisphosphate 1-kinase activity; inositol tetrakisphosphate 6-kinase activity
Cellular component	cytosol; intracellular anatomical structure; apical plasma membrane; cytoplasm
Biological process	phosphorylation; blood coagulation; inositol phosphate metabolic process; inositol trisphosphate metabolic process; neural tube development; signal transduction; dephosphorylation; necroptosis; inositol phosphorylation
Sources:Amigo / QuickGO
Orthologs
Databases	NCBI: entry; OMA: entry
Species	Human	Mouse
Entrez	3705	217837
Ensembl	ENSG00000100605; ENSG00000274958	ENSMUSG00000057963
UniProt	Q13572	Q8BYN3
RefSeq (mRNA)	NM_014216; NM_001142593; NM_001142594; NM_001363707	NM_172584
RefSeq (protein)	NP_001136065; NP_001136066; NP_055031; NP_001350636	NP_766172
Location (UCSC)	Chr 14: 92.94 – 93.12 Mb	Chr 12: 102.53 – 102.67 Mb
PubMed search
- Wikidata
View/Edit Human	View/Edit Mouse

Inositol-tetrakisphosphate 1-kinase is an enzyme that in humans is encoded by the ITPK1 gene.

It is involved in inositol signalling pathways which regulate the conductance of calcium-activated chloride channels, and therefore could be relevant in the study of cystic fibrosis.
