= Small nucleolar RNA, C/D box 9 =

SNORD9

Identifiers
- Aliases: SNORD9, mgU6-53B, small nucleolar RNA, C/D box 9
- External IDs: GeneCards: SNORD9; OMA:SNORD9 - orthologs

Gene location (Human)
Chr.	Chromosome 14 (human)
Band	14q11.2	Start	21,392,150 bp
Band	14q11.2	End	21,392,253 bp
RNA expression pattern
Bgee	Human / Mouse (ortholog); Top expressed in: sural nerve; granulocyte; olfactory zone of nasal mucosa; human kidney; liver; monocyte; gastric mucosa; endometrium; Achilles tendon; bone marrow / n/a; More reference expression data
BioGPS	n/a
Orthologs
Species	Human	Mouse
Entrez	692053	n/a
Ensembl	ENSG00000199436	n/a
UniProt	n a	n/a
RefSeq (mRNA)	n/a	n/a
RefSeq (protein)	n/a	n/a
Location (UCSC)	Chr 14: 21.39 – 21.39 Mb	n/a
PubMed search		n/a
- Wikidata
View/Edit Human

Small nucleolar RNA, C/D box 9 is a protein that in humans is encoded by the SNORD9 gene.
