= IFI27 =

Protein-coding gene in the species Homo sapiens

Identifiers
- Aliases: IFI27, FAM14D, ISG12, ISG12A, P27, interferon alpha inducible protein 27
- External IDs: OMIM: 600009; HomoloGene: 128815; GeneCards: IFI27; OMA:IFI27 - orthologs

Gene location (Human)
Chr.	Chromosome 14 (human)
Band	14q32.12	Start	94,104,836 bp
Band	14q32.12	End	94,116,695 bp
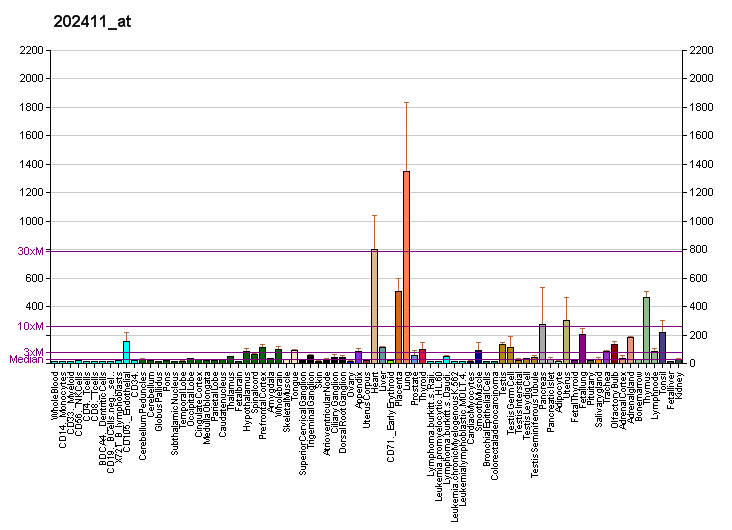
RNA expression pattern
Bgee	Human / Mouse (ortholog); Top expressed in: right lung; gallbladder; spleen; mucosa of transverse colon; apex of heart; upper lobe of left lung; right uterine tube; olfactory zone of nasal mucosa; subcutaneous adipose tissue; rectum / n/a; More reference expression data
BioGPS	More reference expression data
Gene ontology
Molecular function	lamin binding; molecular function; protein binding; identical protein binding
Cellular component	integral component of membrane; mitochondrial outer membrane; nuclear inner membrane; membrane; mitochondrion; nuclear envelope; mitochondrial membranes; nucleus; endoplasmic reticulum; endoplasmic reticulum membrane
Biological process	apoptotic signaling pathway; negative regulation of transcription by RNA polymerase II; activation of cysteine-type endopeptidase activity involved in apoptotic process; type I interferon signaling pathway; regulation of protein export from nucleus; apoptotic process; proteasome-mediated ubiquitin-dependent protein catabolic process; modulation by host of viral genome replication; innate immune response; defense response to virus; protein K48-linked ubiquitination; extrinsic apoptotic signaling pathway; immune system process; viral process
Sources:Amigo / QuickGO
Orthologs
Species	Human	Mouse
Entrez	3429	n/a
Ensembl	ENSG00000165949; ENSG00000275214	n/a
UniProt	P40305	n/a
RefSeq (mRNA)	NM_005532; NM_001130080; NM_001288952; NM_001288954; NM_001288956 NM_001288957; NM_001288958; NM_001288959; NM_001288960; NM_001288995; NM_001366993; NM_001366994	n/a
RefSeq (protein)	NP_001123552; NP_001275881; NP_001275883; NP_001275885; NP_001275886 NP_001275887; NP_001275888; NP_001275889; NP_001275924; NP_005523; NP_001353922; NP_001353923	n/a
Location (UCSC)	Chr 14: 94.1 – 94.12 Mb	n/a
PubMed search		n/a
- Wikidata
View/Edit Human

Interferon alpha-inducible protein 27 is a protein that in humans is encoded by the IFI27 gene.
