= FCF1 =

Protein-coding gene in the species Homo sapiens

Identifiers
- Aliases: FCF1, Bka, C14orf111, UTP24, CGI-35, FCF1 rRNA-processing protein, rRNA-processing protein
- External IDs: MGI: 1920986; GeneCards: FCF1

Gene location (Human)
Chr.	Chromosome 14 (human)
Band	14q24.3	Start	74,713,144 bp
Band	14q24.3	End	74,738,620 bp

Gene location (Mouse)
Chr.	Chromosome 12 (mouse)
Band	12|12 D1	Start	85,017,671 bp
Band	12|12 D1	End	85,030,077 bp
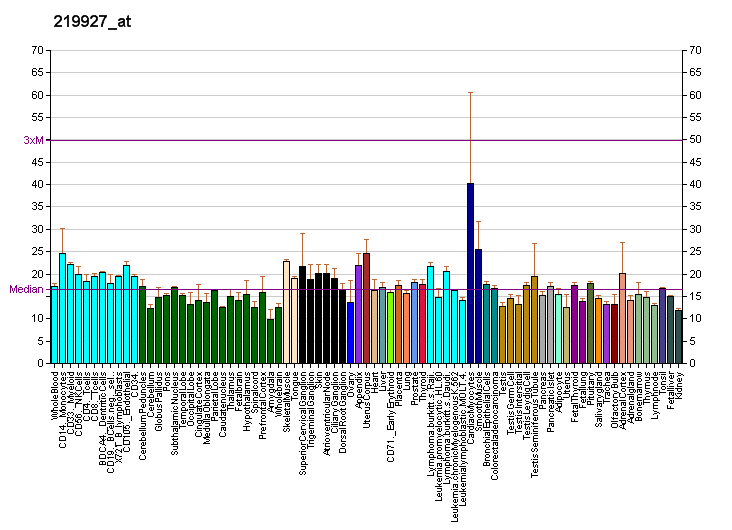

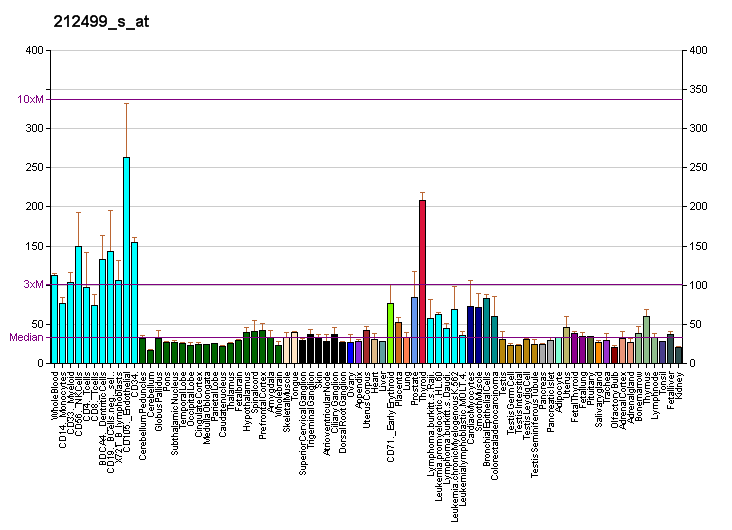
RNA expression pattern
Bgee	Human / Mouse (ortholog); Top expressed in: germinal epithelium; rectum; monocyte; amniotic fluid; islet of Langerhans; mucosa of paranasal sinus; gingival epithelium; stromal cell of endometrium; Achilles tendon; palpebral conjunctiva / Top expressed in: primary oocyte; yolk sac; morula; epiblast; embryo; embryo; secondary oocyte; blastocyst; genital tubercle; tail of embryo; More reference expression data
BioGPS	More reference expression data
Gene ontology
Molecular function	RNA binding
Cellular component	small-subunit processome; nucleolus; nucleus; nucleoplasm
Biological process	ribosome biogenesis; rRNA processing; endonucleolytic cleavage in 5'-ETS of tricistronic rRNA transcript (SSU-rRNA, 5.8S rRNA, LSU-rRNA); endonucleolytic cleavage in ITS1 to separate SSU-rRNA from 5.8S rRNA and LSU-rRNA from tricistronic rRNA transcript (SSU-rRNA, 5.8S rRNA, LSU-rRNA); maturation of SSU-rRNA from tricistronic rRNA transcript (SSU-rRNA, 5.8S rRNA, LSU-rRNA)
Sources:Amigo / QuickGO
Orthologs
Databases	NCBI: entry; OMA: entry
Species	Human	Mouse
Entrez	51077	73736
Ensembl	ENSG00000119616	ENSMUSG00000021243
UniProt	Q9Y324	Q9CTH6
RefSeq (mRNA)	NM_015962; NM_001318508	NM_028632
RefSeq (protein)	NP_001305437; NP_057046	NP_082908
Location (UCSC)	Chr 14: 74.71 – 74.74 Mb	Chr 12: 85.02 – 85.03 Mb
PubMed search
- Wikidata
View/Edit Human	View/Edit Mouse

rRNA-processing protein FCF1 homolog is a protein that in humans is encoded by the FCF1 gene.
