= MAPK1IP1L =

Protein-coding gene in the species Homo sapiens

Identifiers
- Aliases: MAPK1IP1L, C14orf32, MISS, c14_5346, mitogen-activated protein kinase 1 interacting protein 1-like, mitogen-activated protein kinase 1 interacting protein 1 like
- External IDs: OMIM: 617226; MGI: 2444022; HomoloGene: 44893; GeneCards: MAPK1IP1L; OMA:MAPK1IP1L - orthologs

Gene location (Human)
Chr.	Chromosome 14 (human)
Band	14q22.3	Start	55,051,647 bp
Band	14q22.3	End	55,070,194 bp

Gene location (Mouse)
Chr.	Chromosome 14 (mouse)
Band	14|14 C1	Start	47,535,723 bp
Band	14|14 C1	End	47,560,661 bp
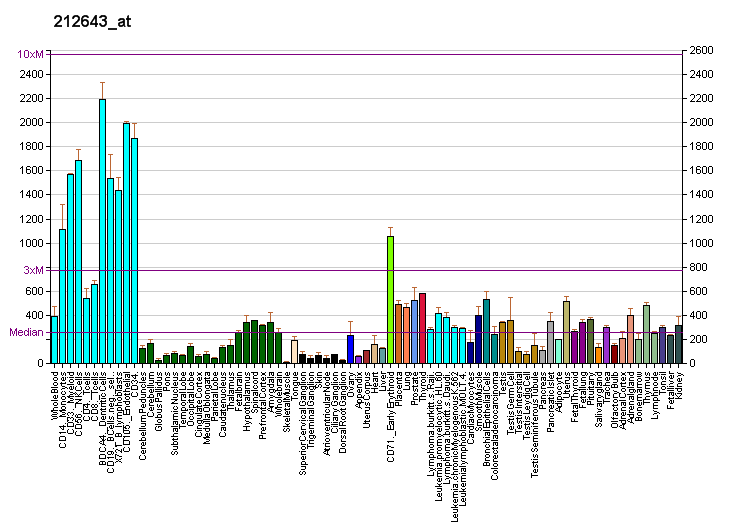

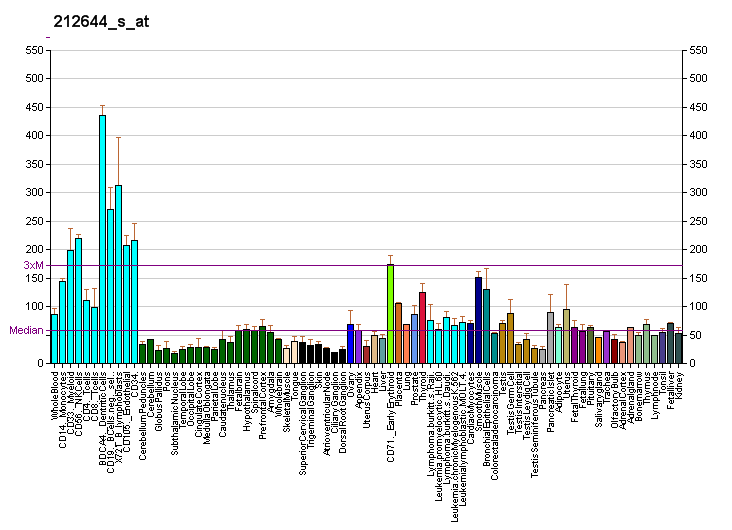

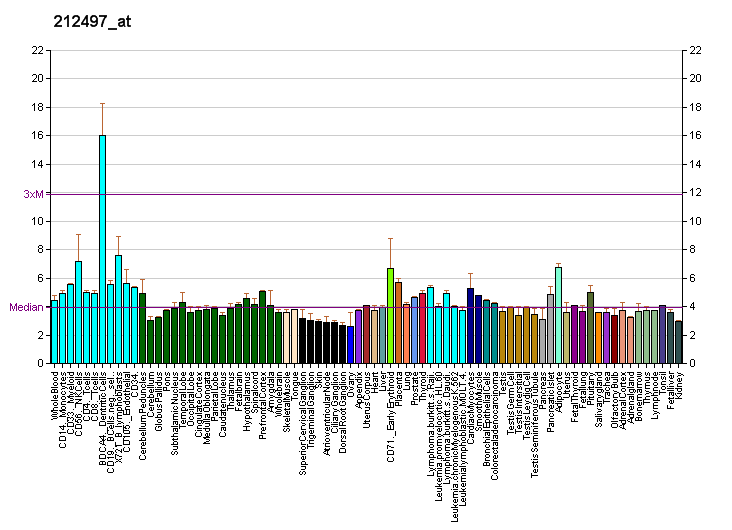
RNA expression pattern
Bgee	Human / Mouse (ortholog); Top expressed in: tail of epididymis; caput epididymis; corpus epididymis; parotid gland; mucosa of sigmoid colon; renal medulla; hair follicle; cartilage tissue; nipple; vena cava / Top expressed in: hand; abdominal wall; endocardial cushion; Gonadal ridge; mandibular prominence; migratory enteric neural crest cell; atrioventricular valve; tail of embryo; maxillary prominence; dermis; More reference expression data
BioGPS	More reference expression data
Orthologs
Species	Human	Mouse
Entrez	93487	218975
Ensembl	ENSG00000168175	ENSMUSG00000021840
UniProt	Q8NDC0	Q8BH93
RefSeq (mRNA)	NM_144578	NM_178684; NM_001360542
RefSeq (protein)	NP_653179	NP_848799; NP_001347471
Location (UCSC)	Chr 14: 55.05 – 55.07 Mb	Chr 14: 47.54 – 47.56 Mb
PubMed search
- Wikidata
View/Edit Human	View/Edit Mouse

MAPK-interacting and spindle-stabilizing protein-like is a protein that in humans is encoded by the MAPK1IP1L gene.
