= TC2N =

Protein-coding gene in the species Homo sapiens

Identifiers
- Aliases: TC2N, C14orf47, C2CD1, MTAC2D1, Tac2-N, tandem C2 domains, nuclear, TAC2N
- External IDs: MGI: 1921663; GeneCards: TC2N

Gene location (Human)
Chr.	Chromosome 14 (human)
Band	14q32.12	Start	91,779,746 bp
Band	14q32.12	End	91,867,536 bp

Gene location (Mouse)
Chr.	Chromosome 12 (mouse)
Band	12|12 E	Start	101,611,702 bp
Band	12|12 E	End	101,684,782 bp
RNA expression pattern
Bgee	Human / Mouse (ortholog); Top expressed in: body of pancreas; tonsil; olfactory zone of nasal mucosa; gallbladder; Descending thoracic aorta; ascending aorta; islet of Langerhans; epithelium of colon; salivary gland; minor salivary glands / Top expressed in: seminal vesicula; parotid gland; lacrimal gland; epithelium of stomach; retinal pigment epithelium; Epithelium of choroid plexus; submandibular gland; transitional epithelium of urinary bladder; left lung lobe; olfactory epithelium; More reference expression data
BioGPS	n/a
Gene ontology
Molecular function	clathrin binding; calcium ion binding; syntaxin binding; molecular function; calcium-dependent phospholipid binding
Cellular component	nucleus; plasma membrane; cellular component; synapse; presynapse
Biological process	vesicle fusion; calcium ion-regulated exocytosis of neurotransmitter; regulation of calcium ion-dependent exocytosis
Sources:Amigo / QuickGO
Orthologs
Databases	NCBI: entry; OMA: entry
Species	Human	Mouse
Entrez	123036	74413
Ensembl	ENSG00000276776; ENSG00000165929	ENSMUSG00000021187
UniProt	Q8N9U0	Q91XT6
RefSeq (mRNA)	NM_152332; NM_001128595; NM_001128596; NM_001289134	NM_001082976; NM_001286364; NM_028924
RefSeq (protein)	NP_001122067; NP_001122068; NP_001276063; NP_689545	NP_001076445; NP_083200
Location (UCSC)	Chr 14: 91.78 – 91.87 Mb	Chr 12: 101.61 – 101.68 Mb
PubMed search
- Wikidata
View/Edit Human	View/Edit Mouse

Tandem C2 domains nuclear protein is a protein that in humans is encoded by the TC2N gene.
