= GPHB5 =

Protein-coding gene in the species Homo sapiens

Identifiers
- Aliases: GPHB5, B5, GPB5, ZLUT1, glycoprotein hormone beta 5, glycoprotein hormone subunit beta 5
- External IDs: OMIM: 609652; MGI: 2156540; GeneCards: GPHB5

Gene location (Human)
Chr.	Chromosome 14 (human)
Band	14q23.2	Start	63,312,835 bp
Band	14q23.2	End	63,318,935 bp

Gene location (Mouse)
Chr.	Chromosome 12 (mouse)
Band	12|12 C3	Start	75,458,496 bp
Band	12|12 C3	End	75,463,555 bp
RNA expression pattern
Bgee	Human / Mouse (ortholog); Top expressed in: gonad; right hemisphere of cerebellum; thigh; muscle of thigh; prefrontal cortex; Brodmann area 9; lymph node; hypothalamus; right frontal lobe; nucleus accumbens / Top expressed in: embryo; primary oocyte; zygote; neural tube; More reference expression data
BioGPS	n/a
Gene ontology
Molecular function	hormone activity; thyrotropin-releasing hormone receptor binding; protein heterodimerization activity; protein binding
Cellular component	extracellular region; extracellular space; cytoplasm
Biological process	regulation of thyroid hormone mediated signaling pathway; cell-cell signaling; hormone-mediated signaling pathway; cell surface receptor signaling pathway; regulation of signaling receptor activity; G protein-coupled receptor signaling pathway; adenylate cyclase-activating G protein-coupled receptor signaling pathway
Sources:Amigo / QuickGO
Orthologs
Databases	NCBI: entry; OMA: entry
Species	Human	Mouse
Entrez	122876	217674
Ensembl	ENSG00000179600	ENSMUSG00000048982
UniProt	Q86YW7	Q812B2
RefSeq (mRNA)	NM_145171	NM_175644
RefSeq (protein)	NP_660154	NP_783575
Location (UCSC)	Chr 14: 63.31 – 63.32 Mb	Chr 12: 75.46 – 75.46 Mb
PubMed search
- Wikidata
View/Edit Human	View/Edit Mouse

Glycoprotein hormone beta-5 is a protein that in humans is encoded by the GPHB5 gene.

GPHB5 is a cystine knot-forming polypeptide and a subunit of the dimeric glycoprotein hormone family (Hsu et al., 2002).[supplied by OMIM]
