= ERG28 =

Protein-coding gene in the species Homo sapiens

Identifiers
- Aliases: ERG28, NET51, C14orf1, chromosome 14 open reading frame 1, ergosterol biosynthesis 28 homolog
- External IDs: OMIM: 604576; MGI: 1915571; HomoloGene: 38284; GeneCards: ERG28; OMA:ERG28 - orthologs

Gene location (Human)
Chr.	Chromosome 14 (human)
Band	14q24.3	Start	75,649,791 bp
Band	14q24.3	End	75,660,876 bp

Gene location (Mouse)
Chr.	Chromosome 12 (mouse)
Band	12|12 D2	Start	85,862,222 bp
Band	12|12 D2	End	85,871,324 bp
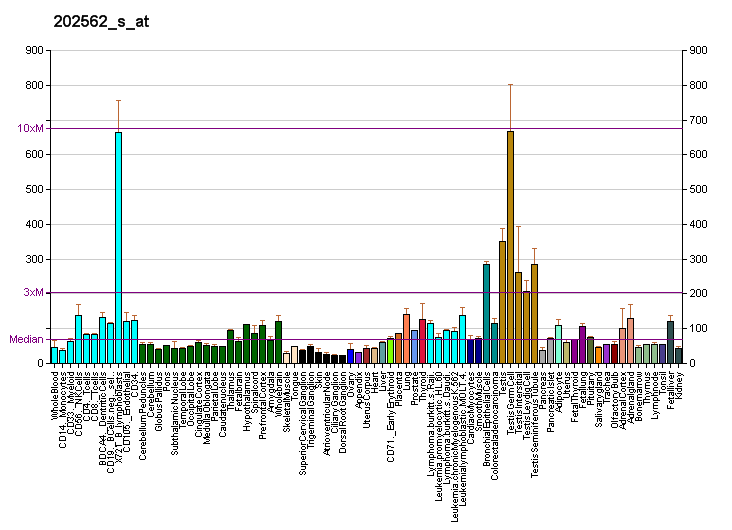

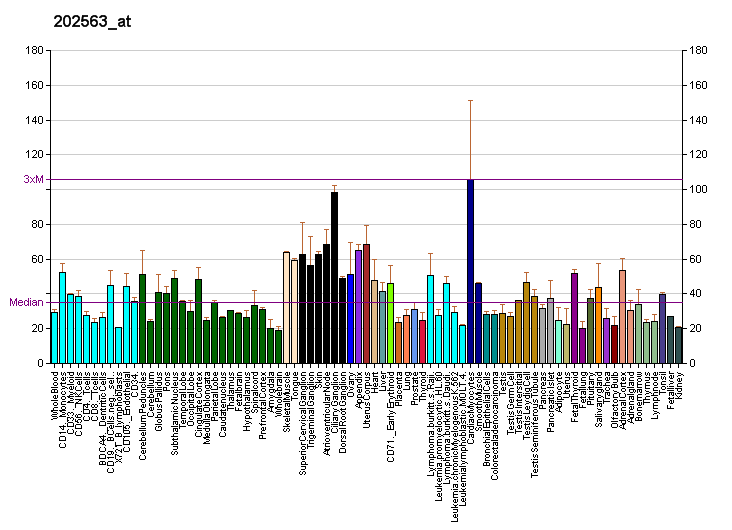

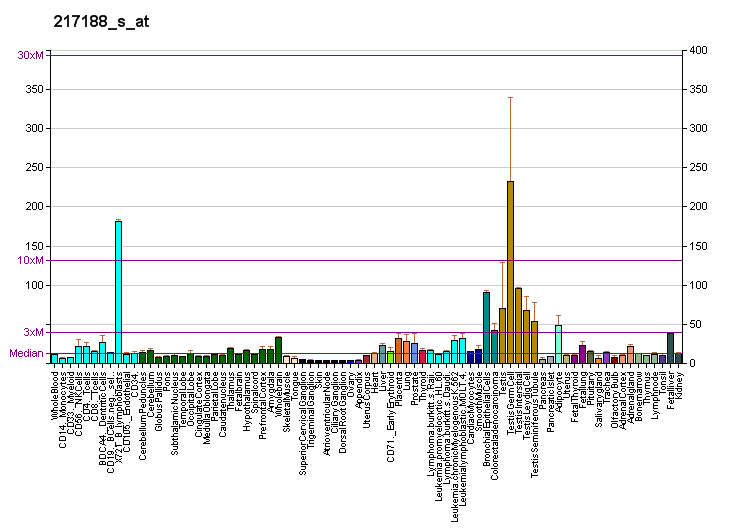
RNA expression pattern
Bgee	Human / Mouse (ortholog); Top expressed in: oocyte; nipple; human penis; gingival epithelium; left testis; right testis; corpus epididymis; retinal pigment epithelium; secondary oocyte; right lobe of liver / Top expressed in: genital tubercle; zygote; tail of embryo; yolk sac; dentate gyrus of hippocampal formation granule cell; left lobe of liver; ventricular zone; secondary oocyte; lip; right kidney; More reference expression data
BioGPS	More reference expression data
Gene ontology
Molecular function	protein-macromolecule adaptor activity; molecular function
Cellular component	integral component of membrane; transport vesicle; endoplasmic reticulum; membrane; endoplasmic reticulum membrane
Biological process	steroid metabolic process; sterol biosynthetic process; lipid metabolism; steroid biosynthetic process; ergosterol biosynthetic process; biological process
Sources:Amigo / QuickGO
Orthologs
Species	Human	Mouse
Entrez	11161	58520
Ensembl	ENSG00000133935	ENSMUSG00000021252
UniProt	Q9UKR5	Q9ERY9
RefSeq (mRNA)	NM_007176	NM_021446; NM_001360451; NM_001360813
RefSeq (protein)	NP_009107	NP_067421; NP_001347380; NP_001347742
Location (UCSC)	Chr 14: 75.65 – 75.66 Mb	Chr 12: 85.86 – 85.87 Mb
PubMed search
- Wikidata
View/Edit Human	View/Edit Mouse

Ergosterol biosynthetic protein 28 is a protein that in humans is encoded by the ERG28 gene.
