= EGLN3 =

Protein-coding gene in the species Homo sapiens

Identifiers
- Aliases: EGLN3, HIFP4H3, HIFPH3, PHD3, egl-9 family hypoxia inducible factor 3
- External IDs: OMIM: 606426; MGI: 1932288; GeneCards: EGLN3
Enzyme activity
EC #	BRENDA	ExPASy	KEGG	MetaCyc
1.14.11.29	↗	↗	↗	↗

Gene location (Human)
Chr.	Chromosome 14 (human)
Band	14q13.1	Start	33,924,227 bp
Band	14q13.1	End	34,462,774 bp

Gene location (Mouse)
Chr.	Chromosome 12 (mouse)
Band	12|12 C1	Start	54,225,767 bp
Band	12|12 C1	End	54,250,646 bp
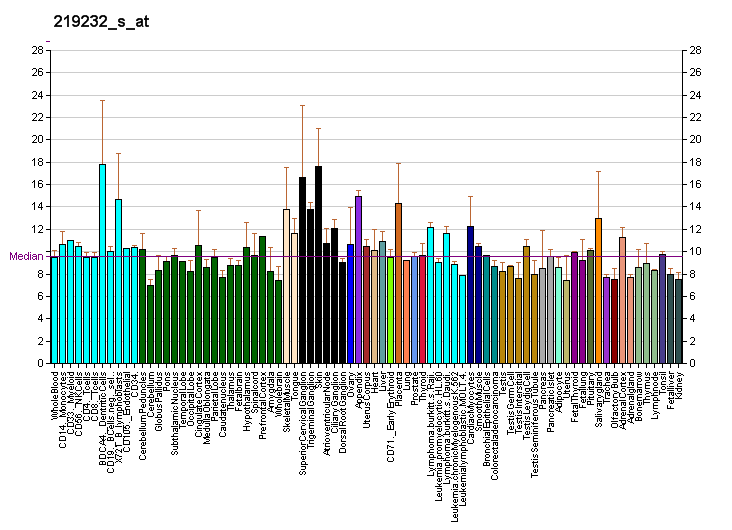
RNA expression pattern
Bgee	Human / Mouse (ortholog); Top expressed in: skin of leg; skin of abdomen; apex of heart; left ventricle; right auricle of heart; ventricular zone; right uterine tube; rectum; C1 segment; amygdala / Top expressed in: temporal muscle; masseter muscle; esophagus; mucous cell of stomach; conjunctival fornix; digastric muscle; epithelium of small intestine; epithelium of stomach; pyloric antrum; sternocleidomastoid muscle; More reference expression data
BioGPS	More reference expression data
Gene ontology
Molecular function	2-oxoglutarate-dependent dioxygenase activity; iron ion binding; L-ascorbic acid binding; dioxygenase activity; metal ion binding; protein binding; oxidoreductase activity, acting on paired donors, with incorporation or reduction of molecular oxygen; oxidoreductase activity; peptidyl-proline 4-dioxygenase activity
Cellular component	nucleoplasm; nucleus; cytoplasm; cytosol
Biological process	response to hypoxia; regulation of neuron apoptotic process; peptidyl-proline hydroxylation to 4-hydroxy-L-proline; cellular response to DNA damage stimulus; regulation of cell population proliferation; regulation of transcription from RNA polymerase II promoter in response to hypoxia; activation of cysteine-type endopeptidase activity involved in apoptotic process; protein hydroxylation; apoptotic process
Sources:Amigo / QuickGO
Orthologs
Databases	NCBI: entry; OMA: entry
Species	Human	Mouse
Entrez	112399	112407
Ensembl	ENSG00000129521	ENSMUSG00000035105
UniProt	Q9H6Z9	Q91UZ4
RefSeq (mRNA)	NM_001308103; NM_022073	NM_028133
RefSeq (protein)	NP_001295032; NP_071356	NP_082409
Location (UCSC)	Chr 14: 33.92 – 34.46 Mb	Chr 12: 54.23 – 54.25 Mb
PubMed search
- Wikidata
View/Edit Human	View/Edit Mouse

Egl nine homolog 3 is a protein that in humans is encoded by the EGLN3 gene. ELGN3 is a member of the superfamily of alpha-ketoglutarate-dependent hydroxylases, which are non-haem iron-containing proteins.
