= FAM181A =

Protein-coding gene in the species Homo sapiens

Identifiers
- Aliases: FAM181A, C14orf152, family with sequence similarity 181 member A
- External IDs: MGI: 3647570; HomoloGene: 34701; GeneCards: FAM181A; OMA:FAM181A - orthologs

Gene location (Human)
Chr.	Chromosome 14 (human)
Band	14q32.12	Start	93,918,894 bp
Band	14q32.12	End	93,929,608 bp

Gene location (Mouse)
Chr.	Chromosome 12 (mouse)
Band	12|12 E	Start	103,277,234 bp
Band	12|12 E	End	103,283,324 bp
RNA expression pattern
Bgee	Human / Mouse (ortholog); Top expressed in: left testis; right testis; testicle; amygdala; ventricular zone; hypothalamus; hippocampus proper; nucleus accumbens; caudate nucleus; anterior cingulate cortex / Top expressed in: spermatocyte; seminiferous tubule; spermatid; epithelium of lens; embryo; ventricular zone; neural tube; embryo; dentate gyrus of hippocampal formation granule cell; mesencephalon; More reference expression data
BioGPS	n/a
Orthologs
Species	Human	Mouse
Entrez	90050	100504156
Ensembl	ENSG00000140067; ENSG00000273533	ENSMUSG00000096753
UniProt	Q8N9Y4	n/a
RefSeq (mRNA)	NM_001207071; NM_001207072; NM_001207073; NM_001207074; NM_138344	NM_001195726
RefSeq (protein)	NP_001194000; NP_001194001; NP_001194002; NP_001194003; NP_612353	n/a
Location (UCSC)	Chr 14: 93.92 – 93.93 Mb	Chr 12: 103.28 – 103.28 Mb
PubMed search
- Wikidata
View/Edit Human	View/Edit Mouse

Family with sequence similarity 181, member A is a protein that in humans is encoded by the FAM181A gene.
