= PELI2 =

Protein-coding gene in the species Homo sapiens

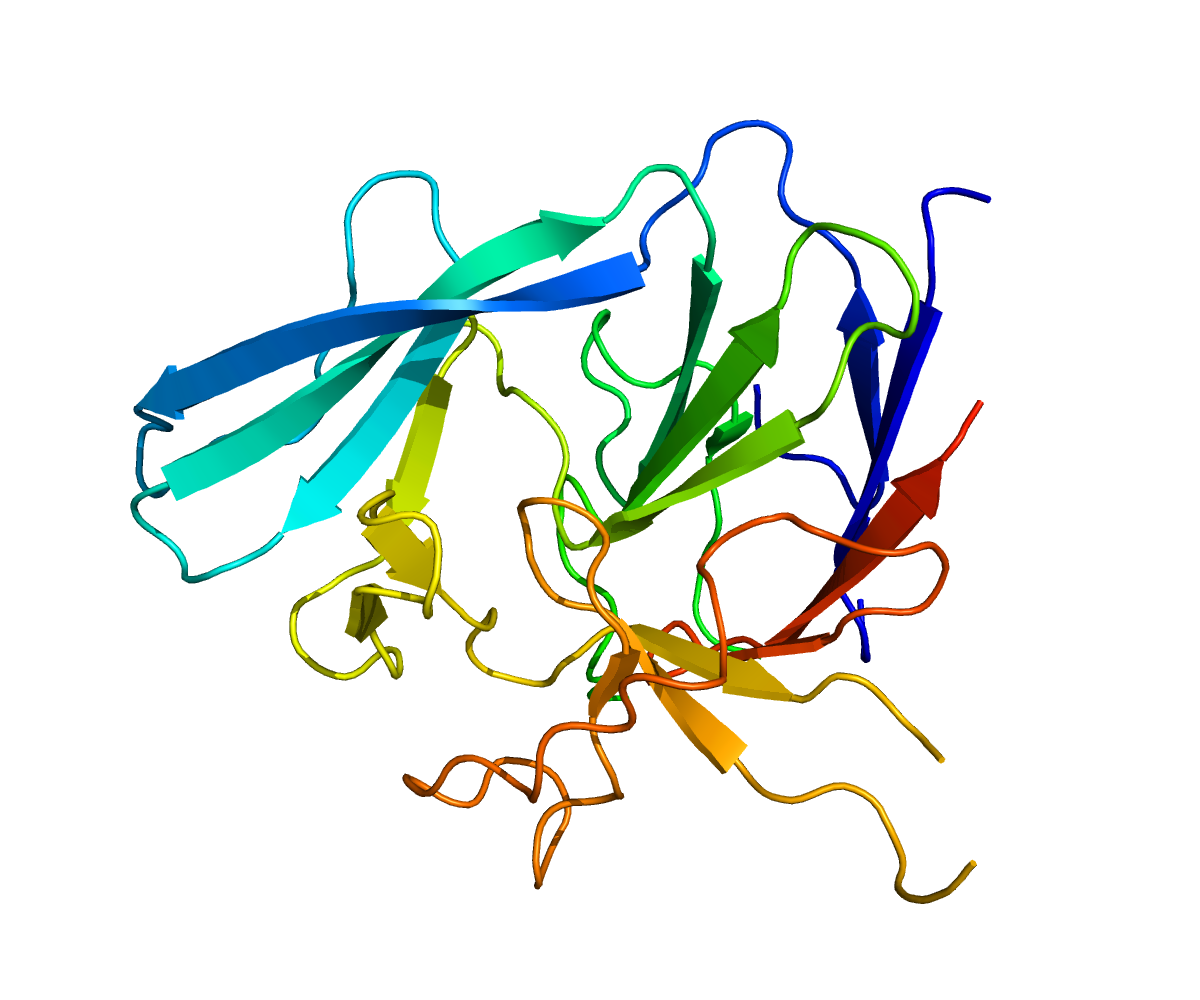

Identifiers
- Aliases: PELI2, pellino E3 ubiquitin protein ligase family member 2
- External IDs: OMIM: 614798; MGI: 1891445; GeneCards: PELI2
Available structures
PDB	Ortholog search: PDBe RCSB
PDB	List of PDB id codes 3EGA, 3EGB
Enzyme activity
EC #	BRENDA	ExPASy	KEGG	MetaCyc
2.3.2.27	↗	↗	↗	↗

Gene location (Human)
Chr.	Chromosome 14 (human)
Band	14q22.3	Start	56,117,814 bp
Band	14q22.3	End	56,301,524 bp

Gene location (Mouse)
Chr.	Chromosome 14 (mouse)
Band	14 C1|14 24.6 cM	Start	48,358,280 bp
Band	14 C1|14 24.6 cM	End	48,519,032 bp
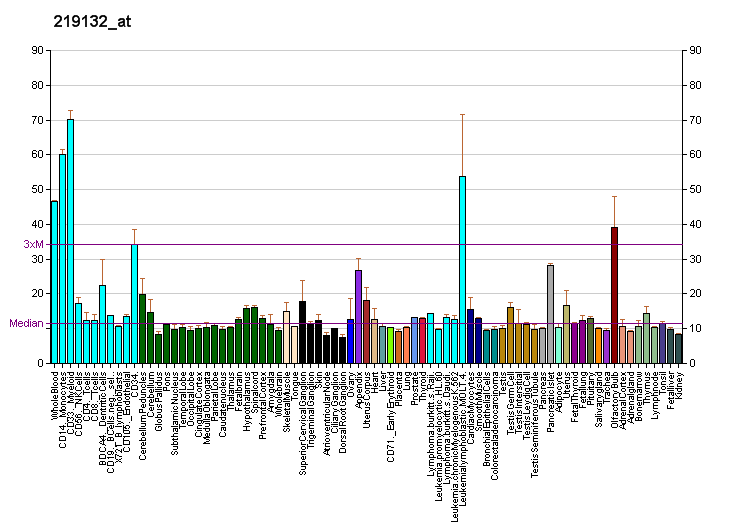
RNA expression pattern
Bgee	Human / Mouse (ortholog); Top expressed in: ventricular zone; testicle; ganglionic eminence; Achilles tendon; jejunal mucosa; monocyte; body of pancreas; metanephric glomerulus; blood; sural nerve / Top expressed in: basilar part of occipital bone; spermatid; fibula; splanchnocranium; seminiferous tubule; spermatocyte; Meckel's cartilage; sciatic nerve; ascending aorta; aortic valve; More reference expression data
BioGPS	More reference expression data
Gene ontology
Molecular function	protein binding; ubiquitin-ubiquitin ligase activity; protein serine/threonine kinase activity; transferase activity; ubiquitin protein ligase activity
Cellular component	cytosol
Biological process	positive regulation of I-kappaB kinase/NF-kappaB signaling; positive regulation of protein phosphorylation; protein ubiquitination; positive regulation of MAPK cascade; protein polyubiquitination; protein phosphorylation; immune response; Toll signaling pathway; interleukin-1-mediated signaling pathway; regulation of Toll signaling pathway
Sources:Amigo / QuickGO
Orthologs
Databases	NCBI: entry; OMA: entry
Species	Human	Mouse
Entrez	57161	93834
Ensembl	ENSG00000139946	ENSMUSG00000021846
UniProt	Q9HAT8	Q8BST6
RefSeq (mRNA)	NM_021255	NM_033602
RefSeq (protein)	NP_067078	NP_291080
Location (UCSC)	Chr 14: 56.12 – 56.3 Mb	Chr 14: 48.36 – 48.52 Mb
PubMed search
- Wikidata
View/Edit Human	View/Edit Mouse

Protein pellino homolog 2 is a protein that in humans is encoded by the PELI2 gene.
