= CLBA1 =

Protein-coding gene in humans

Identifiers
- Aliases: CLBA1, C14orf79, chromosome 14 open reading frame 79, clathrin binding box of aftiphilin containing, clathrin binding box of aftiphilin containing 1
- External IDs: MGI: 2443738; HomoloGene: 17077; GeneCards: CLBA1; OMA:CLBA1 - orthologs

Gene location (Human)
| Chr. | Chromosome 14 (human) |
| Band | 14q32.33 | Start | 104,985,775 bp |
| Band | 14q32.33 | End | 105,010,482 bp |

Gene location (Mouse)
| Chr. | Chromosome 12 (mouse) |
| Band | 12 F1|12 61.2 cM | Start | 112,772,557 bp |
| Band | 12 F1|12 61.2 cM | End | 112,779,872 bp |
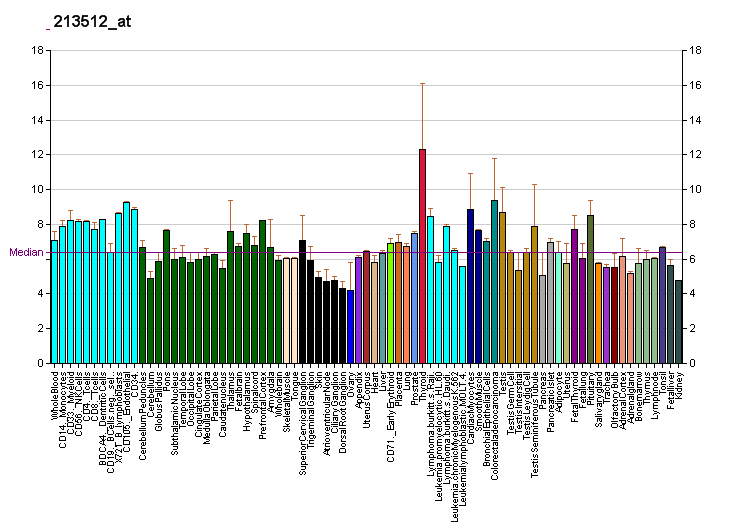
RNA expression pattern
| Bgee | Human / Mouse (ortholog); Top expressed in: right uterine tube; right testis; left testis; anterior pituitary; right lobe of thyroid gland; left lobe of thyroid gland; bronchial epithelial cell; gonad; parotid gland; olfactory zone of nasal mucosa / Top expressed in: proximal tubule; spermatocyte; spermatid; right kidney; testicle; secondary oocyte; human kidney; zygote; mesencephalon; neural tube; More reference expression data |
| BioGPS | More reference expression data |
Gene ontology
| Molecular function | clathrin binding |
| Cellular component | cytoplasm; AP-1 adaptor complex; trans-Golgi network membrane |
| Biological process | intracellular transport; protein transport |
Sources:Amigo / QuickGO
Orthologs
| Species | Human | Mouse |
| Entrez | 122616 | 217887 |
| Ensembl | ENSG00000140104 | ENSMUSG00000037594 |
| UniProt | Q96F83 | Q8BHN9 |
| RefSeq (mRNA) | NM_174891; NM_001364170 | NM_145450 |
| RefSeq (protein) | NP_777551; NP_001351099 | NP_663425 |
| Location (UCSC) | Chr 14: 104.99 – 105.01 Mb | Chr 12: 112.77 – 112.78 Mb |
| PubMed search |
- Wikidata
| View/Edit Human | View/Edit Mouse |

Uncharacterized protein CLBA1 is a protein that in humans is encoded by the CLBA1 gene.
