= CNIH =

Protein-coding gene in the species Homo sapiens

CNIH1

Identifiers
- Aliases: CNIH1, CNIH, CNIH-1, CNIL, TGAM77, cornichon family AMPA receptor auxiliary protein 1
- External IDs: OMIM: 611287; MGI: 1277202; HomoloGene: 4219; GeneCards: CNIH1; OMA:CNIH1 - orthologs

Gene location (Human)
Chr.	Chromosome 14 (human)
Band	14q22.2	Start	54,423,561 bp
Band	14q22.2	End	54,441,391 bp

Gene location (Mouse)
Chr.	Chromosome 14 (mouse)
Band	14|14 C1	Start	47,013,024 bp
Band	14|14 C1	End	47,025,868 bp
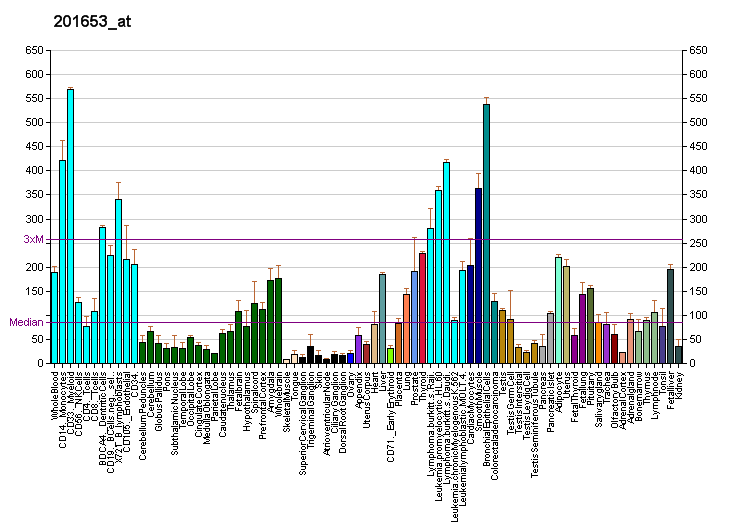
RNA expression pattern
Bgee	Human / Mouse (ortholog); Top expressed in: jejunal mucosa; cartilage tissue; retinal pigment epithelium; germinal epithelium; rectum; gallbladder; secondary oocyte; islet of Langerhans; stromal cell of endometrium; monocyte / Top expressed in: maxillary prominence; mandibular prominence; endothelial cell of lymphatic vessel; dermis; somite; calvaria; migratory enteric neural crest cell; atrium; molar; optic nerve; More reference expression data
BioGPS	More reference expression data
Orthologs
Species	Human	Mouse
Entrez	10175	12793
Ensembl	ENSG00000100528	ENSMUSG00000015759
UniProt	O95406	O35372
RefSeq (mRNA)	NM_005776; NM_001009551	NM_009919; NM_001355011
RefSeq (protein)	NP_005767	NP_034049; NP_001341940
Location (UCSC)	Chr 14: 54.42 – 54.44 Mb	Chr 14: 47.01 – 47.03 Mb
PubMed search
- Wikidata
View/Edit Human	View/Edit Mouse

Protein cornichon homolog 1 is a protein that in humans is encoded by the CNIH1 gene (previously CNIH). The CNIH1 protein may regulate the transportation of proteins from the TGF alpha family.
