= RTRAF =

Protein-coding gene in the species Homo sapiens

Identifiers
- Aliases: RTRAF, CGI99, CLE, CLE7, LCRP369, RLLM1, CGI-99, C14orf166, hCLE1, chromosome 14 open reading frame 166, RNA transcription, translation and transport factor, hCLE
- External IDs: OMIM: 610858; MGI: 1915295; HomoloGene: 9355; GeneCards: RTRAF; OMA:RTRAF - orthologs

Gene location (Human)
Chr.	Chromosome 14 (human)
Band	14q22.1	Start	51,989,514 bp
Band	14q22.1	End	52,010,694 bp

Gene location (Mouse)
Chr.	Chromosome 14 (mouse)
Band	14|14 A3	Start	19,861,419 bp
Band	14|14 A3	End	19,873,892 bp
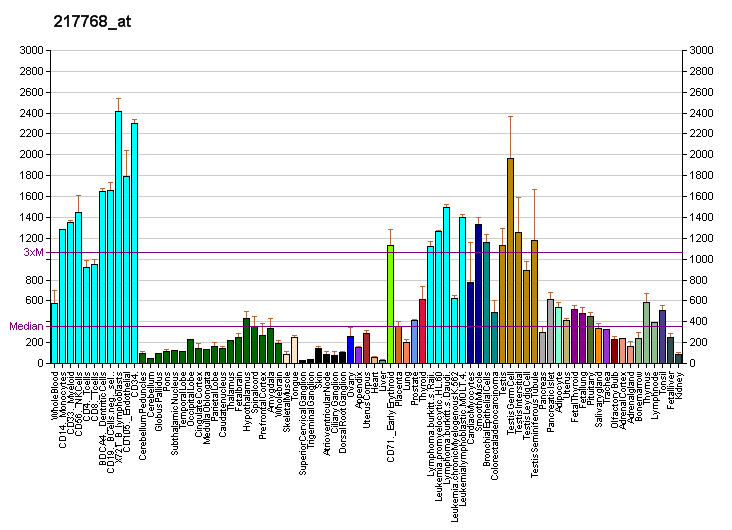
RNA expression pattern
Bgee	Human / Mouse (ortholog); Top expressed in: secondary oocyte; gonad; right testis; left testis; cartilage tissue; ganglionic eminence; Achilles tendon; palpebral conjunctiva; right ventricle; body of pancreas / Top expressed in: fossa; condyle; medial ganglionic eminence; endothelial cell of lymphatic vessel; trigeminal ganglion; primitive streak; renal corpuscle; vestibular sensory epithelium; medullary collecting duct; vas deferens; More reference expression data
BioGPS	More reference expression data
Gene ontology
Molecular function	RNA polymerase II complex binding; identical protein binding; RNA binding; protein binding
Cellular component	cytoskeleton; cytosol; nucleus; tRNA-splicing ligase complex; cytoplasm; microtubule organizing center; nucleoplasm; centrosome; perinuclear region of cytoplasm; mitotic spindle
Biological process	RNA transport; regulation of transcription, DNA-templated; positive regulation of transcription by RNA polymerase II; transcription, DNA-templated; viral process; tRNA splicing, via endonucleolytic cleavage and ligation; negative regulation of protein kinase activity
Sources:Amigo / QuickGO
Orthologs
Species	Human	Mouse
Entrez	51637	68045
Ensembl	ENSG00000087302	ENSMUSG00000021807
UniProt	Q9Y224	Q9CQE8
RefSeq (mRNA)	NM_016039	NM_026528
RefSeq (protein)	NP_057123	NP_080804
Location (UCSC)	Chr 14: 51.99 – 52.01 Mb	Chr 14: 19.86 – 19.87 Mb
PubMed search
- Wikidata
View/Edit Human	View/Edit Mouse

RNA transcription, translation and transport factor is a protein that in humans is encoded by the RTRAF gene.
