= Long intergenic non-protein coding RNA 637 =

PPP1R13B-DT

Identifiers
- Aliases: PPP1R13B-DT, long intergenic non-protein coding RNA 637, HITT, LINC00637, PPP1R13B divergent transcript
- External IDs: GeneCards: PPP1R13B-DT; OMA:PPP1R13B-DT - orthologs

Gene location (Human)
Chr.	Chromosome 14 (human)
Band	14q32.33	Start	103,847,721 bp
Band	14q32.33	End	103,858,049 bp
RNA expression pattern
Bgee	Human / Mouse (ortholog); Top expressed in: testicle; ganglionic eminence; islet of Langerhans; blood; olfactory zone of nasal mucosa; duodenum; mucosa of transverse colon; liver; right uterine tube; prefrontal cortex / n/a; More reference expression data
BioGPS	n/a
Orthologs
Species	Human	Mouse
Entrez	145216	n/a
Ensembl	ENSG00000258735	n/a
UniProt	n a	n/a
RefSeq (mRNA)	n/a	n/a
RefSeq (protein)	n/a	n/a
Location (UCSC)	Chr 14: 103.85 – 103.86 Mb	n/a
PubMed search		n/a
- Wikidata
View/Edit Human

Long intergenic non-protein coding RNA 637 is a protein that in humans is encoded by the LINC00637 gene.
