= LINC00520 =

Identifiers
- Aliases: LINC00520, C14orf34, long intergenic non-protein coding RNA 520, LASSIE, LEENE
- External IDs: GeneCards: LINC00520

Gene location (Human)
Chr.	Chromosome 14 (human)
Band	14q22.3	Start	55,781,132 bp
Band	14q22.3	End	55,796,731 bp
RNA expression pattern
Bgee	Human / Mouse (ortholog); Top expressed in: amniotic fluid; superficial temporal artery; mucosa of paranasal sinus; testicle; lower lobe of lung; cardia; skin of thigh; skin of hip; gastric mucosa; superior surface of tongue / n/a; More reference expression data
BioGPS	n/a
Orthologs
Databases	NCBI: entry; OMA: entry
Species	Human	Mouse
Entrez	645687	n/a
Ensembl	ENSG00000258791	n/a
UniProt	n a	n/a
RefSeq (mRNA)	n/a	n/a
RefSeq (protein)	n/a	n/a
Location (UCSC)	Chr 14: 55.78 – 55.8 Mb	n/a
PubMed search		n/a
- Wikidata
View/Edit Human

Long intergenic non-protein coding RNA 520 is a long non-coding RNA that in humans is encoded by the LINC00520 gene.
