= YLPM1 =

Protein-coding gene in the species Homo sapiens

Identifiers
- Aliases: YLPM1, C14orf170, PPP1R169, ZAP113, ZAP3, YLP motif containing 1
- External IDs: MGI: 1926195; GeneCards: YLPM1

Gene location (Human)
Chr.	Chromosome 14 (human)
Band	14q24.3	Start	74,763,316 bp
Band	14q24.3	End	74,859,435 bp

Gene location (Mouse)
Chr.	Chromosome 12 (mouse)
Band	12|12 D1	Start	85,043,095 bp
Band	12|12 D1	End	85,117,289 bp
RNA expression pattern
Bgee	Human / Mouse (ortholog); Top expressed in: ganglionic eminence; tendon of biceps brachii; sural nerve; sperm; ventricular zone; right uterine tube; left ovary; right ovary; internal globus pallidus; right hemisphere of cerebellum / Top expressed in: saccule; otic placode; otic vesicle; tail of embryo; Paneth cell; ureter; genital tubercle; motor neuron; ventricular zone; renal corpuscle; More reference expression data
BioGPS	n/a
Gene ontology
Molecular function	protein binding; RNA binding; DNA-binding transcription repressor activity, RNA polymerase II-specific
Cellular component	nucleus; nucleoplasm; cytosol; nuclear speck
Biological process	regulation of transcription, DNA-templated; transcription, DNA-templated; negative regulation of transcription by RNA polymerase II; biological process; regulation of telomere maintenance
Sources:Amigo / QuickGO
Orthologs
Databases	NCBI: entry; OMA: entry
Species	Human	Mouse
Entrez	56252	56531
Ensembl	ENSG00000119596	ENSMUSG00000021244
UniProt	P49750	Q9R0I7
RefSeq (mRNA)	NM_019589	NM_178363; NM_001347421
RefSeq (protein)	NP_062535	NP_001334350; NP_848140
Location (UCSC)	Chr 14: 74.76 – 74.86 Mb	Chr 12: 85.04 – 85.12 Mb
PubMed search
- Wikidata
View/Edit Human	View/Edit Mouse

YLP motif-containing protein 1 is a protein that in humans is encoded by the YLPM1 gene.
