= 60S ribosomal protein L10-like =

Protein found in humans

RPL10L

Identifiers
- Aliases: RPL10L, RPL10_5_1358, ribosomal protein L10 like, SPGF63
- External IDs: MGI: 3647985; GeneCards: RPL10L
Available structures
PDB	Ortholog search: PDBe RCSB
PDB	List of PDB id codes 4UG0, 4V6X

Gene location (Human)
Chr.	Chromosome 14 (human)
Band	14q21.2	Start	46,651,010 bp
Band	14q21.2	End	46,651,781 bp

Gene location (Mouse)
Chr.	Chromosome 12 (mouse)
Band	12|12 C2	Start	66,330,153 bp
Band	12|12 C2	End	66,331,175 bp
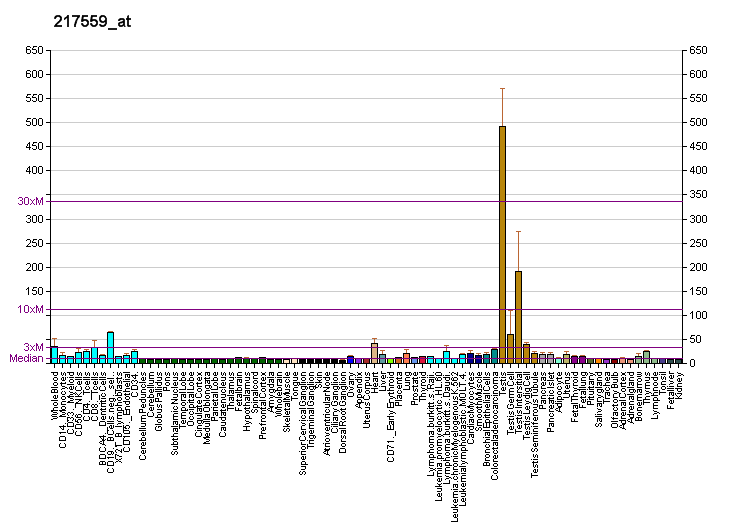
RNA expression pattern
Bgee	Human / Mouse (ortholog); Top expressed in: left testis; right testis; sperm; testicle; gonad; epithelium of nasopharynx; germinal epithelium; periodontal fiber; mucosa of transverse colon; rectum / Top expressed in: spermatocyte; spermatid; testicle; morula; blastocyst; embryo; embryo; epiblast; primary oocyte; yolk sac; More reference expression data
BioGPS	More reference expression data
Gene ontology
Molecular function	structural constituent of ribosome; RNA binding
Cellular component	polysome; cytosolic large ribosomal subunit; ribosome; intracellular anatomical structure; membrane; nucleus; endoplasmic reticulum; cytosol
Biological process	protein biosynthesis; ribosomal large subunit assembly; spermatogenesis
Sources:Amigo / QuickGO
Orthologs
Databases	NCBI: entry; OMA: entry
Species	Human	Mouse
Entrez	140801	238217
Ensembl	ENSG00000165496	ENSMUSG00000060499
UniProt	Q96L21	P86048
RefSeq (mRNA)	NM_080746	NM_001162933
RefSeq (protein)	NP_542784	NP_001156405
Location (UCSC)	Chr 14: 46.65 – 46.65 Mb	Chr 12: 66.33 – 66.33 Mb
PubMed search
- Wikidata
View/Edit Human	View/Edit Mouse

60S ribosomal protein L10-like is a protein that in humans is encoded by the RPL10L gene.

== Function ==
This gene encodes a protein sharing sequence similarity with ribosomal protein L10 (RPL10). It is not currently known whether the encoded protein is a functional ribosomal protein or whether it has evolved a function that is independent of the ribosome. This gene is intronless.
