= VIPAS39 =

Protein-coding gene in humans

Identifiers
- Aliases: VIPAS39, C14orf133, SPE-39, SPE39, VIPAR, VPS16B, hSPE-39, VPS33B interacting protein, apical-basolateral polarity regulator, spe-39 homolog
- External IDs: OMIM: 613401; MGI: 2144805; GeneCards: VIPAS39

Gene location (Human)
Chr.	Chromosome 14 (human)
Band	14q24.3	Start	77,426,675 bp
Band	14q24.3	End	77,457,952 bp

Gene location (Mouse)
Chr.	Chromosome 12 (mouse)
Band	12|12 D2	Start	87,285,642 bp
Band	12|12 D2	End	87,313,030 bp
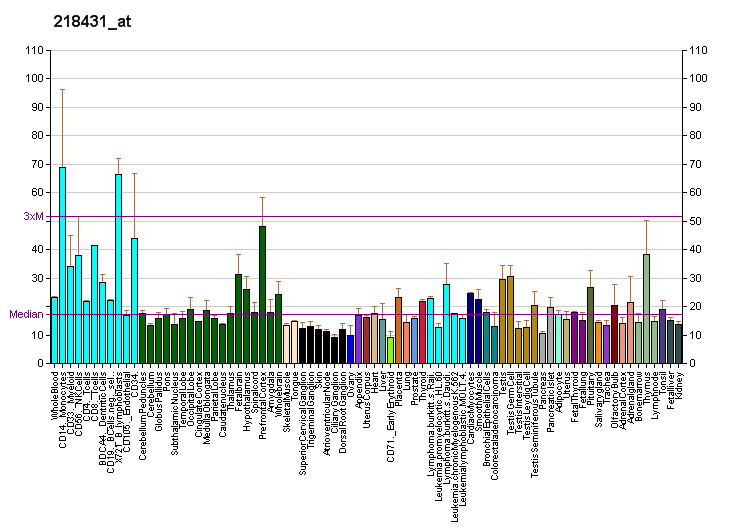
RNA expression pattern
Bgee	Human / Mouse (ortholog); Top expressed in: ganglionic eminence; gonad; tendon of biceps brachii; gastric mucosa; testicle; Achilles tendon; popliteal artery; tibial arteries; stromal cell of endometrium; Descending thoracic aorta / Top expressed in: saccule; otic vesicle; otic placode; granulocyte; spermatocyte; ventricular zone; ganglionic eminence; medial ganglionic eminence; right kidney; neural layer of retina; More reference expression data
BioGPS	More reference expression data
Gene ontology
Molecular function	protein binding; protein-containing complex binding
Cellular component	HOPS complex; endosome; cytoplasmic vesicle; early endosome; cytoplasm; late endosome; recycling endosome; Golgi apparatus
Biological process	protein transport; cell differentiation; autophagosome maturation; regulation of transcription, DNA-templated; transcription, DNA-templated; spermatogenesis; endosome to lysosome transport; intracellular protein transport; collagen fibril organization; post-translational protein modification; peptidyl-lysine hydroxylation; collagen metabolic process
Sources:Amigo / QuickGO
Orthologs
Databases	NCBI: entry; OMA: entry
Species	Human	Mouse
Entrez	63894	104799
Ensembl	ENSG00000151445	ENSMUSG00000021038
UniProt	Q9H9C1	Q8BGQ1
RefSeq (mRNA)	NM_001193314; NM_001193315; NM_001193316; NM_001193317; NM_022067	NM_001142580; NM_001142581; NM_134044
RefSeq (protein)	NP_001180243; NP_001180244; NP_001180245; NP_001180246; NP_071350	NP_001136052; NP_001136053; NP_598805
Location (UCSC)	Chr 14: 77.43 – 77.46 Mb	Chr 12: 87.29 – 87.31 Mb
PubMed search
- Wikidata
View/Edit Human	View/Edit Mouse

Spermatogenesis-defective protein 39 homolog is a protein that in humans is encoded by the VIPAS39 gene. This protein is involved in the sorting of lysosomal proteins. Mutations in this gene are associated with ARCS2 (arthrogryposis, renal dysfunction, and cholestasis-2). Alternative splicing results in multiple transcript variants.
