= ACIN1 =

Protein-coding gene in the species Homo sapiens

Identifiers
- Aliases: ACIN1, ACINUS, ACN, fSAP152, apoptotic chromatin condensation inducer 1
- External IDs: OMIM: 604562; MGI: 1891824; GeneCards: ACIN1

Gene location (Human)
Chr.	Chromosome 14 (human)
Band	14q11.2	Start	23,058,564 bp
Band	14q11.2	End	23,095,614 bp

Gene location (Mouse)
Chr.	Chromosome 14 (mouse)
Band	14|14 C2	Start	54,642,161 bp
Band	14|14 C2	End	54,686,931 bp
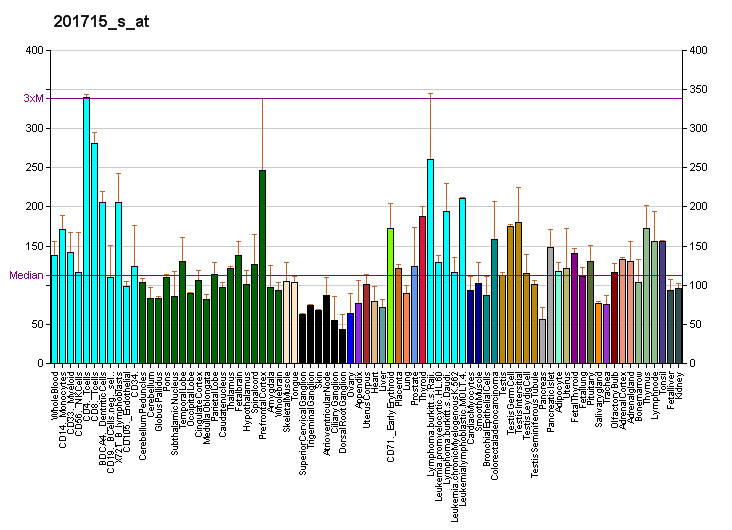
RNA expression pattern
Bgee	Human / Mouse (ortholog); Top expressed in: right uterine tube; right lobe of thyroid gland; sural nerve; left lobe of thyroid gland; right ovary; left ovary; body of uterus; canal of the cervix; right adrenal cortex; anterior pituitary / Top expressed in: neural layer of retina; tail of embryo; ventricular zone; genital tubercle; yolk sac; granulocyte; Rostral migratory stream; primary visual cortex; superior frontal gyrus; lip; More reference expression data
BioGPS	More reference expression data
Gene ontology
Molecular function	ATPase activity; protein binding; enzyme binding; nucleic acid binding; RNA binding
Cellular component	nuclear speck; plasma membrane; exon-exon junction complex; nucleoplasm; nucleolus; ASAP complex; nucleus; cytosol
Biological process	apoptotic chromosome condensation; mRNA processing; negative regulation of mRNA splicing, via spliceosome; RNA splicing; positive regulation of apoptotic process; positive regulation of monocyte differentiation; erythrocyte differentiation; apoptotic process; execution phase of apoptosis
Sources:Amigo / QuickGO
Orthologs
Databases	NCBI: entry; OMA: entry
Species	Human	Mouse
Entrez	22985	56215
Ensembl	ENSG00000100813	ENSMUSG00000022185
UniProt	Q9UKV3	Q9JIX8
RefSeq (mRNA)	NM_001164814; NM_001164815; NM_001164816; NM_001164817; NM_014977 NM_001386863	NM_001085472; NM_001085473; NM_001242605; NM_001242606; NM_019567 NM_023190
RefSeq (protein)	NP_001158286; NP_001158287; NP_001158288; NP_001158289; NP_055792	NP_001078941; NP_001078942; NP_001229534; NP_001229535; NP_062513 NP_075679; NP_001361699
Location (UCSC)	Chr 14: 23.06 – 23.1 Mb	Chr 14: 54.64 – 54.69 Mb
PubMed search
- Wikidata
View/Edit Human	View/Edit Mouse

Apoptotic chromatin condensation inducer in the nucleus is a protein that in humans is encoded by the ACIN1 gene.
