= ZBTB1 =

Protein-coding gene in the species Homo sapiens

Identifiers
- Aliases: ZBTB1, ZNF909, zinc finger and BTB domain containing 1
- External IDs: OMIM: 616578; MGI: 2442326; GeneCards: ZBTB1

Gene location (Human)
Chr.	Chromosome 14 (human)
Band	14q23.3	Start	64,503,712 bp
Band	14q23.3	End	64,533,690 bp

Gene location (Mouse)
Chr.	Chromosome 12 (mouse)
Band	12|12 C3	Start	76,417,040 bp
Band	12|12 C3	End	76,443,724 bp
RNA expression pattern
Bgee	Human / Mouse (ortholog); Top expressed in: sperm; Achilles tendon; lymph node; right uterine tube; mononuclear cell; monocyte; skin of hip; cartilage tissue; germinal epithelium; stromal cell of endometrium / Top expressed in: cumulus cell; lacrimal gland; hair follicle; trigeminal ganglion; blood; sciatic nerve; lymph node; conjunctival fornix; female urethra; ascending aorta; More reference expression data
BioGPS	n/a
Gene ontology
Molecular function	DNA binding; protein homodimerization activity; metal ion binding; K63-linked polyubiquitin modification-dependent protein binding; protein binding; protein heterodimerization activity; nucleic acid binding; DNA-binding transcription factor activity, RNA polymerase II-specific
Cellular component	nuclear body; nucleoplasm; nucleus; nuclear membrane
Biological process	positive regulation of T cell differentiation; chromatin remodeling; cell differentiation; positive regulation of pro-T cell differentiation; regulation of transcription, DNA-templated; positive regulation of natural killer cell differentiation; T cell differentiation in thymus; thymus development; immune system process; cellular response to UV; mRNA transcription by RNA polymerase II; negative regulation of transcription by RNA polymerase II; transcription, DNA-templated; positive regulation of T cell mediated immunity; translesion synthesis; B cell differentiation; innate immune response; protein homooligomerization; DNA repair; cellular response to DNA damage stimulus
Sources:Amigo / QuickGO
Orthologs
Databases	NCBI: entry; OMA: entry
Species	Human	Mouse
Entrez	22890	268564
Ensembl	ENSG00000126804	ENSMUSG00000033454
UniProt	Q9Y2K1	Q91VL9
RefSeq (mRNA)	NM_001123329; NM_014950	NM_178744; NM_001364323
RefSeq (protein)	NP_001116801; NP_055765	NP_848859; NP_001351252
Location (UCSC)	Chr 14: 64.5 – 64.53 Mb	Chr 12: 76.42 – 76.44 Mb
PubMed search
- Wikidata
View/Edit Human	View/Edit Mouse

Zinc finger and BTB domain containing 1 is a protein in humans that is encoded by the ZBTB1 gene.

ZBTB1 is essential for the development of lymphocytes in mice: T cells are absent from ZBTB1 mutant mice, and numbers of B cells and natural killer cells are reduced.
