= Cyclin dependent kinase like 1 =

Protein-coding gene in the species Homo sapiens

CDKL1
Available structures
PDB	Ortholog search: PDBe RCSB
PDB	List of PDB id codes 4AGU

Identifiers
- Aliases: CDKL1, KKIALRE, P42, cyclin dependent kinase like 1
- External IDs: OMIM: 603441; MGI: 1918341; HomoloGene: 55805; GeneCards: CDKL1; OMA:CDKL1 - orthologs

Gene location (Human)
Chr.	Chromosome 14 (human)
Band	14q21.3	Start	50,326,265 bp
Band	14q21.3	End	50,416,461 bp

Gene location (Mouse)
Chr.	Chromosome 12 (mouse)
Band	12|12 C2	Start	69,793,622 bp
Band	12|12 C2	End	69,838,041 bp
RNA expression pattern
Bgee	Human / Mouse (ortholog); Top expressed in: right uterine tube; Achilles tendon; canal of the cervix; body of uterus; ectocervix; epithelium of colon; muscle layer of sigmoid colon; right lobe of thyroid gland; left ovary; monocyte / Top expressed in: right kidney; human kidney; lumbar subsegment of spinal cord; spermatid; spermatocyte; dentate gyrus of hippocampal formation granule cell; blood; visual cortex; primary visual cortex; superior frontal gyrus; More reference expression data
BioGPS	n/a
Gene ontology
Molecular function	transferase activity; nucleotide binding; protein kinase activity; protein serine/threonine kinase activity; ATP binding; kinase activity; cyclin-dependent protein serine/threonine kinase activity
Cellular component	cytoplasm; extracellular exosome; nucleus; nucleoplasm; intracellular membrane-bounded organelle; ciliary transition zone
Biological process	development of the heart; phosphorylation; regulation of cell cycle; protein phosphorylation; regulation of cilium assembly
Sources:Amigo / QuickGO
Orthologs
Species	Human	Mouse
Entrez	8814	71091
Ensembl	ENSG00000100490	ENSMUSG00000020990
UniProt	Q00532	Q8CEQ0
RefSeq (mRNA)	NM_001282236; NM_004196; NM_001367064; NM_001367065	NM_183294
RefSeq (protein)	NP_001269165; NP_004187; NP_001353993; NP_001353994	NP_899117
Location (UCSC)	Chr 14: 50.33 – 50.42 Mb	Chr 12: 69.79 – 69.84 Mb
PubMed search
- Wikidata
View/Edit Human	View/Edit Mouse

Cyclin dependent kinase like 1 is a protein that in humans is encoded by the CDKL1 gene.

== Function ==
This gene product is a member of a large family of CDC2-related serine/threonine protein kinases. It accumulates primarily in the nucleus, and two transcript variants encoding different isoforms have been found for this gene.
