= SGPP1 =

Protein-coding gene in the species Homo sapiens

Identifiers
- Aliases: SGPP1, SPPase1, sphingosine-1-phosphate phosphatase 1, SPP-1
- External IDs: OMIM: 612826; MGI: 2135760; GeneCards: SGPP1

Gene location (Human)
Chr.	Chromosome 14 (human)
Band	14q23.2	Start	63,684,216 bp
Band	14q23.2	End	63,728,065 bp

Gene location (Mouse)
Chr.	Chromosome 12 (mouse)
Band	12|12 C3	Start	75,761,023 bp
Band	12|12 C3	End	75,782,503 bp
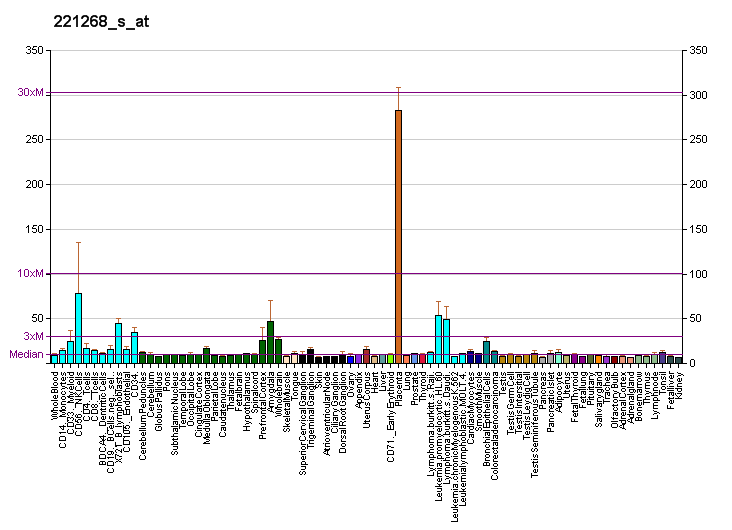
RNA expression pattern
Bgee	Human / Mouse (ortholog); Top expressed in: lymph node; placenta; islet of Langerhans; C1 segment; endometrium; human kidney; right lobe of liver; Brodmann area 9; Achilles tendon; prefrontal cortex / Top expressed in: seminal vesicula; lobe of prostate; decidua; lacrimal gland; gastrula; skin of abdomen; proximal tubule; parotid gland; right kidney; gastric mucosa; More reference expression data
BioGPS	More reference expression data
Gene ontology
Molecular function	hydrolase activity; sphingosine-1-phosphate phosphatase activity; dihydrosphingosine-1-phosphate phosphatase activity
Cellular component	integral component of membrane; endoplasmic reticulum membrane; endoplasmic reticulum; membrane; plasma membrane; nucleus; nucleoplasm
Biological process	intrinsic apoptotic signaling pathway; sphingosine metabolic process; sphingolipid biosynthetic process; extrinsic apoptotic signaling pathway; dephosphorylation; sphinganine-1-phosphate metabolic process; sphingolipid metabolic process; ER to Golgi ceramide transport; regulation of keratinocyte differentiation; regulation of epidermis development
Sources:Amigo / QuickGO
Orthologs
Databases	NCBI: entry; OMA: entry
Species	Human	Mouse
Entrez	81537	81535
Ensembl	ENSG00000126821; ENSG00000285281	ENSMUSG00000021054
UniProt	Q9BX95	Q9JI99
RefSeq (mRNA)	NM_030791	NM_030750
RefSeq (protein)	NP_110418	NP_109675
Location (UCSC)	Chr 14: 63.68 – 63.73 Mb	Chr 12: 75.76 – 75.78 Mb
PubMed search
- Wikidata
View/Edit Human	View/Edit Mouse

Sphingosine-1-phosphate phosphatase 1 is an enzyme that in humans is encoded by the SGPP1 gene.
