= T cell receptor alpha joining 56 =

Gene in the species Homo sapiens

TRAJ56

Identifiers
- Aliases: TRAJ56, T cell receptor alpha joining 56
- External IDs: GeneCards: TRAJ56; OMA:TRAJ56 - orthologs

Gene location (Human)
Chr.	Chromosome 14 (human)
Band	14q11.2	Start	22,479,521 bp
Band	14q11.2	End	22,479,582 bp
RNA expression pattern
Bgee	Human / Mouse (ortholog); Top expressed in: granulocyte; tonsil; blood; lymph node; small intestine; intestinal epithelium; left uterine tube; left ventricle; monocyte; spleen / n/a; More reference expression data
BioGPS	n/a
Orthologs
Species	Human	Mouse
Entrez	28699	n/a
Ensembl	ENSG00000211835	n/a
UniProt	n a	n/a
RefSeq (mRNA)	n/a	n/a
RefSeq (protein)	n/a	n/a
Location (UCSC)	Chr 14: 22.48 – 22.48 Mb	n/a
PubMed search		n/a
- Wikidata
View/Edit Human

T cell receptor alpha joining 56 is a protein that in humans is encoded by the TRAJ56 gene.
