= JKAMP =

Protein-coding gene in the species Homo sapiens

Identifiers
- Aliases: JKAMP, C14orf100, HSPC213, HSPC327, JAMP, CDA06, JNK1/MAPK8-associated membrane protein, C24orf100, JNK1/MAPK8 associated membrane protein
- External IDs: OMIM: 611176; MGI: 1915057; HomoloGene: 9524; GeneCards: JKAMP; OMA:JKAMP - orthologs

Gene location (Human)
Chr.	Chromosome 14 (human)
Band	14q23.1	Start	59,484,443 bp
Band	14q23.1	End	59,505,410 bp

Gene location (Mouse)
Chr.	Chromosome 12 (mouse)
Band	12|12 C3	Start	72,132,363 bp
Band	12|12 C3	End	72,148,235 bp
RNA expression pattern
Bgee	Human / Mouse (ortholog); Top expressed in: islet of Langerhans; tibia; monocyte; retinal pigment epithelium; pancreatic epithelial cell; parietal pleura; cardiac muscle tissue of right atrium; skin of arm; bronchial epithelial cell; rectum / Top expressed in: facial motor nucleus; Rostral migratory stream; retinal pigment epithelium; ciliary body; Epithelium of choroid plexus; iris; anterior horn of spinal cord; substantia nigra; external carotid artery; internal carotid artery; More reference expression data
BioGPS	n/a
Gene ontology
Molecular function	ubiquitin protein ligase binding
Cellular component	integral component of membrane; endoplasmic reticulum membrane; endoplasmic reticulum; membrane
Biological process	response to unfolded protein; ubiquitin-dependent ERAD pathway
Sources:Amigo / QuickGO
Orthologs
Species	Human	Mouse
Entrez	51528	104771
Ensembl	ENSG00000050130	ENSMUSG00000005078
UniProt	Q9P055	Q8BI36
RefSeq (mRNA)	NM_001098625; NM_001284201; NM_001284202; NM_001284203; NM_001284204 NM_016475	NM_001205067; NM_024205
RefSeq (protein)	NP_001092095; NP_001271130; NP_001271131; NP_001271132; NP_001271133 NP_057559; NP_001271130.1	NP_001191996; NP_077167
Location (UCSC)	Chr 14: 59.48 – 59.51 Mb	Chr 12: 72.13 – 72.15 Mb
PubMed search
- Wikidata
View/Edit Human	View/Edit Mouse

JNK1-associated membrane protein is a protein that in humans is encoded by the JKAMP gene.
