= NEMF (gene) =

Protein-coding gene in the species Homo sapiens

Available structures
PDB	Ortholog search: PDBe RCSB
PDB	List of PDB id codes 3J92

Identifiers
- Aliases: NEMF, NY-CO-1, SDCCAG1, nuclear export mediator factor, IDDSAPN
- External IDs: OMIM: 608378; MGI: 1918305; HomoloGene: 3458; GeneCards: NEMF; OMA:NEMF - orthologs

Gene location (Human)
Chr.	Chromosome 14 (human)
Band	14q21.3	Start	49,782,083 bp
Band	14q21.3	End	49,852,821 bp

Gene location (Mouse)
Chr.	Chromosome 12 (mouse)
Band	12|12 C2	Start	69,357,296 bp
Band	12|12 C2	End	69,403,939 bp
RNA expression pattern
Bgee	Human / Mouse (ortholog); Top expressed in: Achilles tendon; internal globus pallidus; sperm; Brodmann area 23; pylorus; corpus callosum; external globus pallidus; epithelium of colon; sural nerve; inferior ganglion of vagus nerve / Top expressed in: hand; seminal vesicula; mammillary body; lobe of prostate; ventromedial nucleus; lateral geniculate nucleus; fossa; lateral hypothalamus; pineal gland; lateral septal nucleus; More reference expression data
BioGPS	n/a
Gene ontology
Molecular function	tRNA binding; ribosomal large subunit binding
Cellular component	nucleus; RQC complex
Biological process	nuclear export; rescue of stalled ribosome; ribosome-associated ubiquitin-dependent protein catabolic process
Sources:Amigo / QuickGO
Orthologs
Species	Human	Mouse
Entrez	9147	66244
Ensembl	ENSG00000165525	ENSMUSG00000020982
UniProt	O60524	Q8CCP0
RefSeq (mRNA)	NM_001301732; NM_004713	NM_025441; NM_181665
RefSeq (protein)	NP_001288661; NP_004704	NP_079717
Location (UCSC)	Chr 14: 49.78 – 49.85 Mb	Chr 12: 69.36 – 69.4 Mb
PubMed search
- Wikidata
View/Edit Human	View/Edit Mouse

Nuclear export mediator factor (NEMF) is a protein that in humans is encoded by the NEMF gene.

== Function ==
This gene encodes a component of the ribosome quality control complex. The encoded protein facilitates the recognition and ubiquitination of stalled 60S subunits by the ubiquitin ligase listerin. A similar protein in fly functions as a tumor suppressor.
