= IRF2BPL =

Protein-coding gene in the species Homo sapiens

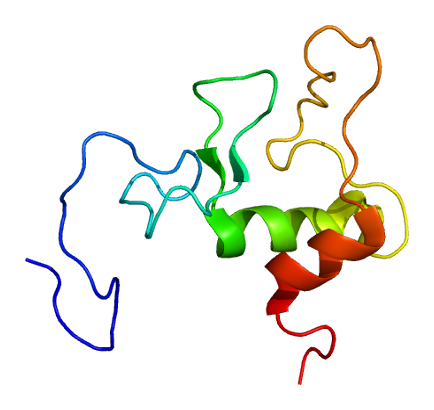

Identifiers
- Aliases: IRF2BPL, C14orf4, EAP1, interferon regulatory factor 2 binding protein like, enhanced at puberty protein 1, NEDAMSS
- External IDs: OMIM: 611720; MGI: 2442463; GeneCards: IRF2BPL
Available structures
PDB	Ortholog search: PDBe RCSB
PDB	List of PDB id codes 2CS3
Enzyme activity
EC #	BRENDA	ExPASy	KEGG	MetaCyc
2.3.2.27	↗	↗	↗	↗

Gene location (Human)
Chr.	Chromosome 14 (human)
Band	14q24.3	Start	77,024,543 bp
Band	14q24.3	End	77,028,708 bp

Gene location (Mouse)
Chr.	Chromosome 12 (mouse)
Band	12|12 D2	Start	86,927,475 bp
Band	12|12 D2	End	86,931,572 bp
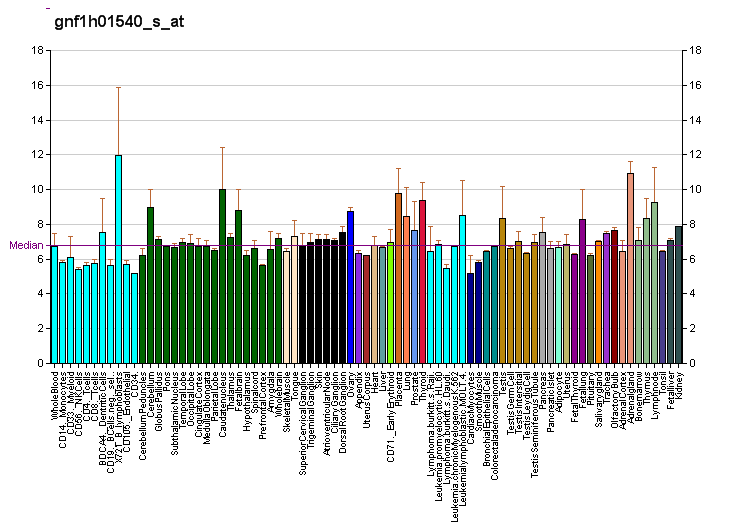
RNA expression pattern
Bgee	Human / Mouse (ortholog); Top expressed in: germinal epithelium; cardiac muscle tissue of right atrium; endothelial cell; parotid gland; pancreatic epithelial cell; epithelium of lactiferous gland; lactiferous duct; myocardium of left ventricle; visceral pleura; skin of arm / Top expressed in: molar; interventricular septum; left lung lobe; cervix; hand; renal corpuscle; medial ganglionic eminence; parotid gland; transitional epithelium of urinary bladder; superior cervical ganglion; More reference expression data
BioGPS	More reference expression data
Gene ontology
Molecular function	metal ion binding; RNA polymerase II transcription regulatory region sequence-specific DNA binding; DNA-binding transcription repressor activity, RNA polymerase II-specific; DNA-binding transcription activator activity, RNA polymerase II-specific; molecular function; protein binding; ubiquitin protein ligase activity; transferase activity
Cellular component	nucleus; nucleoplasm; extracellular space; ubiquitin ligase complex
Biological process	negative regulation of transcription by RNA polymerase II; positive regulation of transcription by RNA polymerase II; development of secondary female sexual characteristics; nervous system development; protein ubiquitination
Sources:Amigo / QuickGO
Orthologs
Databases	NCBI: entry; OMA: entry
Species	Human	Mouse
Entrez	64207	238330
Ensembl	ENSG00000119669	ENSMUSG00000034168
UniProt	Q9H1B7	Q8K3X4
RefSeq (mRNA)	NM_024496	NM_145836
RefSeq (protein)	NP_078772	NP_665835
Location (UCSC)	Chr 14: 77.02 – 77.03 Mb	Chr 12: 86.93 – 86.93 Mb
PubMed search
- Wikidata
View/Edit Human	View/Edit Mouse

Interferon regulatory factor 2 binding protein like is a protein that in humans is encoded by the IRF2BPL gene. Mutations are associated with neurological problems. More specifically, mutations of the gene cause the NEDAMSS syndrome, whose abbreviation stands for NEurodevelopmental Disorder with regression, Abnormal Movements, loss of Speech, and Seizures, first described in 2018.

Research into IRF2BPL-Related Disorder (NEDAMSS) is ongoing, with multiple academic and clinical groups investigating the gene’s role in neurodevelopment and potential therapeutic approaches. Nonprofit organizations, such as Tough Genes, are working to support these efforts to translate research into a cure.
