= MicroRNA 495 =

Human microRNA

MIR495

Identifiers
- Aliases: MIR495, MIRN495, hsa-mir-495, mir-495, microRNA 495
- External IDs: OMIM: 615149; GeneCards: MIR495; OMA:MIR495 - orthologs

Gene location (Human)
Chr.	Chromosome 14 (human)
Band	14q32.31	Start	101,033,755 bp
Band	14q32.31	End	101,033,836 bp
RNA expression pattern
Bgee	Human / Mouse (ortholog); Top expressed in: intestine; colon; blood; placenta; ascending aorta; putamen; caudate nucleus; right lobe of liver; dorsolateral prefrontal cortex; hippocampus proper / n/a; More reference expression data
BioGPS	n/a
Orthologs
Species	Human	Mouse
Entrez	574453	n/a
Ensembl	ENSG00000207743	n/a
UniProt	n a	n/a
RefSeq (mRNA)	n/a	n/a
RefSeq (protein)	n/a	n/a
Location (UCSC)	Chr 14: 101.03 – 101.03 Mb	n/a
PubMed search		n/a
- Wikidata
View/Edit Human

MicroRNA 495 is a protein that in humans is encoded by the MIR495 gene.

== Function ==
microRNAs (miRNAs) are short (20-24 nt) non-coding RNAs that are involved in post-transcriptional regulation of gene expression in multicellular organisms by affecting both the stability and translation of mRNAs. miRNAs are transcribed by RNA polymerase II as part of capped and polyadenylated primary transcripts (pri-miRNAs) that can be either protein-coding or non-coding. The primary transcript is cleaved by the Drosha ribonuclease III enzyme to produce an approximately 70-nt stem-loop precursor miRNA (pre-miRNA), which is further cleaved by the cytoplasmic Dicer ribonuclease to generate the mature miRNA and antisense miRNA star (miRNA*) products. The mature miRNA is incorporated into a RNA-induced silencing complex (RISC), which recognizes target mRNAs through imperfect base pairing with the miRNA and most commonly results in translational inhibition or destabilization of the target mRNA. The RefSeq represents the predicted microRNA stem-loop. [provided by RefSeq, Sep 2009].
