= RALGAPB =

Protein-coding gene in the species Homo sapiens

Identifiers
- Aliases: RALGAPB, KIAA1219, RalGAPbeta, Ral GTPase activating protein non-catalytic beta subunit, Ral GTPase activating protein non-catalytic subunit beta
- External IDs: MGI: 2444531; GeneCards: RALGAPB

Gene location (Human)
Chr.	Chromosome 20 (human)
Band	20q11.23	Start	38,472,816 bp
Band	20q11.23	End	38,578,859 bp

Gene location (Mouse)
Chr.	Chromosome 2 (mouse)
Band	2|2 H1	Start	158,251,768 bp
Band	2|2 H1	End	158,341,173 bp
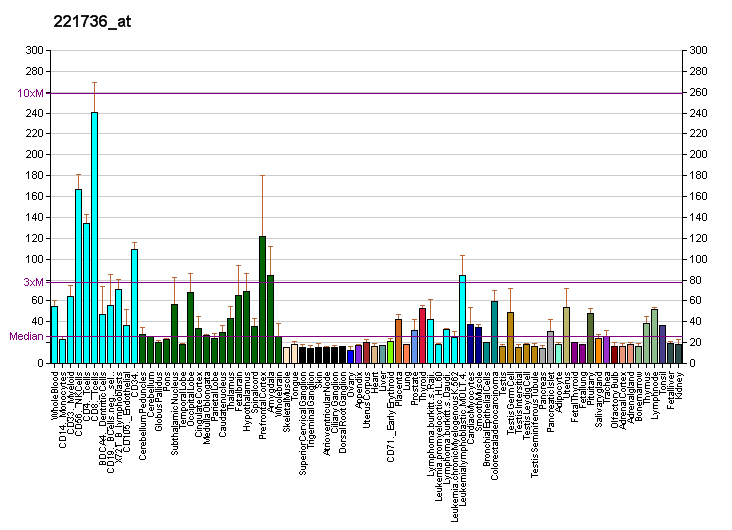

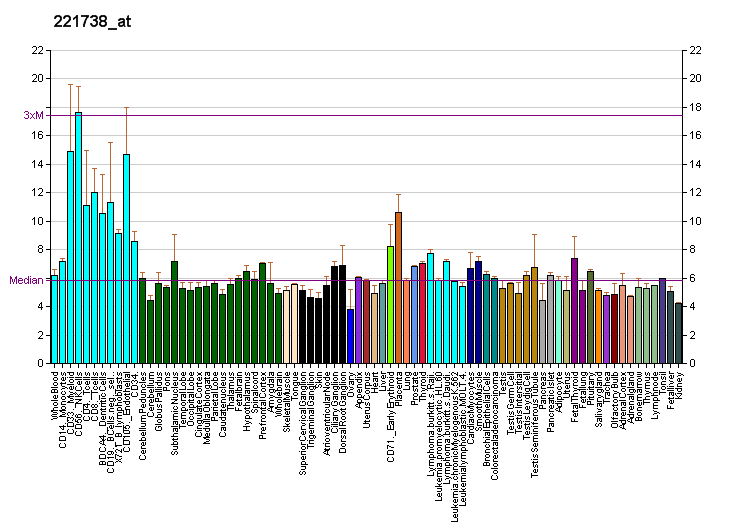
RNA expression pattern
Bgee	Human / Mouse (ortholog); Top expressed in: buccal mucosa cell; sperm; endothelial cell; secondary oocyte; middle temporal gyrus; seminal vesicula; skin of thigh; Brodmann area 23; visceral pleura; corpus epididymis / Top expressed in: substantia nigra; otolith organ; secondary oocyte; utricle; fossa; condyle; hand; epithelium of lens; facial motor nucleus; primary oocyte; More reference expression data
BioGPS	More reference expression data
Orthologs
Databases	NCBI: entry; OMA: entry
Species	Human	Mouse
Entrez	57148	228850
Ensembl	ENSG00000170471	ENSMUSG00000027652
UniProt	Q86X10	Q8BQZ4
RefSeq (mRNA)	NM_001282917; NM_001282918; NM_020336	NM_001291137; NM_001291138; NM_177227; NM_177658; NM_001363006 NM_001369183
RefSeq (protein)	NP_001269846; NP_001269847; NP_065069	n/a
Location (UCSC)	Chr 20: 38.47 – 38.58 Mb	Chr 2: 158.25 – 158.34 Mb
PubMed search
- Wikidata
View/Edit Human	View/Edit Mouse

Ral GTPase-activating protein subunit beta is a protein that in humans is encoded by the RALGAPB gene (previously KIAA1219). It is predicted to be a (non-enzymatic) subunit of the RalGAP1 and RalGAP2 protein complexes which are involved in activating the small GTPases RALA and RALB.
