= TUNAR =

Protein-coding gene found in humans

Identifiers
- Aliases: TUNAR, LINC00617, TUNA, HI-LNC78, TCL1 upstream neural differentiation-associated RNA, BNLN
- External IDs: OMIM: 615719; GeneCards: TUNAR
Orthologs
Databases	NCBI: entry; OMA: entry
Species	Human	Mouse
Entrez	100507043	n/a
Ensembl	ENSG00000250366	n/a
UniProt	A0A1B0GTB2	n/a
RefSeq (mRNA)	n/a	n/a
RefSeq (protein)	n/a	n/a
Location (UCSC)	n/a	n/a
PubMed search		n/a
- Wikidata
View/Edit Human

Protein TUNAR is a protein that in humans is produced from the TUNAR gene. TUNAR was originally believed to encode a long noncoding RNA and was called "TCL1 upstream neural differentiation-associated RNA" (TUNAR), but it was later found to encode a 48-amino acid micropeptide. The protein TUNAR is located in the endoplasmic reticulum where it is involved in calcium regulation.
