= MIA2 =

Identifiers
- Aliases: MIA2
- External IDs: MGI: 2159614; GeneCards: MIA2
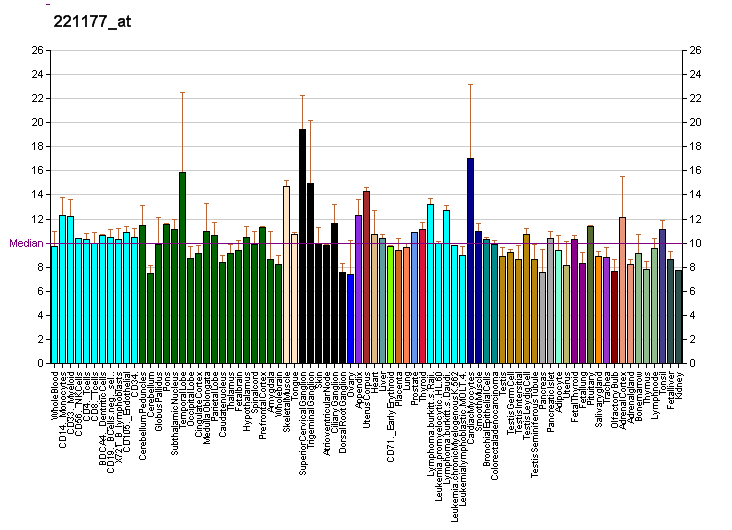
RNA expression pattern
Bgee	Human / Mouse (ortholog); n/a / n/a
BioGPS	More reference expression data
Gene ontology
Molecular function	protein binding
Cellular component	endoplasmic reticulum membrane; endoplasmic reticulum; integral component of membrane; membrane; endoplasmic reticulum exit site
Biological process	lipoprotein transport; vesicle cargo loading; endoplasmic reticulum to Golgi vesicle-mediated transport; protein secretion
Sources:Amigo / QuickGO
Orthologs
Databases	NCBI: entry; OMA: entry
Species	Human	Mouse
Entrez	117153	338320
Ensembl	ENSG00000150526	ENSMUSG00000035349
UniProt	Q96PC5	Q91ZV0
RefSeq (mRNA)	n/a	NM_177321
RefSeq (protein)	NP_001234917; NP_001234918; NP_001234919; NP_001316143; NP_001341066 NP_001341067; NP_001341068; NP_001341069; NP_001341070; NP_001341071; NP_001341072; NP_001341073; NP_001341074; NP_001341075; NP_001341076; NP_001341077; NP_001341078; NP_001341079; NP_001341080; NP_001341081; NP_001341082; NP_001341083; NP_001341084; NP_001341085; NP_001341086; NP_005921; NP_473365; NP_976229; NP_976230; NP_976231	NP_001158725; NP_001158726; NP_001315976; NP_666146; NP_001355768
Location (UCSC)	n/a	n/a
PubMed search
- Wikidata
View/Edit Human	View/Edit Mouse

Melanoma inhibitory activity protein 2 is a protein that in humans is encoded by the MIA2 gene (also called CTAGE5).
