= Monosomy 14 =

Genetic disorder

- Specialty: Medical genetics
- Symptoms: Intellectual disability, coloboma, stunted growth, microcephaly, neural tube defects, heart defects
- Duration: Lifelong
- Types: Full, mosiac
- Causes: Nondisjunction
- Diagnostic method: Karyotype
- Prognosis: Incompatible with life

Monosomy, with the presence of only one chromosome (instead of the typical two in humans) from a pair, which affects chromosome 14. Fetuses with monosomy 14 are not viable. Only mosaic cases typically survive and these usually present with severe symptoms such as intellectual disability, ocular colobomata, microcephaly, and seizures. Organ malformations are also associated due to the chromosome 14 having several genes for organ development, including heart defects, and brain problems. In full monosomy 14 in all cells, the total number of chromosomes is 45 instead of 46. Many are stillborn if the pregnancy does progress to term. The prognosis is generally poor even in mosaic form and the symptoms include intellectual disability, small head, ocular problems, seizures, and heart malformations. They may have kidney issues, ventricular underdevelopment, or brain defects. Their eyes, heart, brain, and head are far less developed than fetuses with two copies of chromosome 14. The severe gene dosage imbalance is common in these fetuses. Some signs include

- Intellectual disabilities
- Coloboma
- Stunted growth
- Microcephaly with ocular problems
- Neural tube defects
- Congenital heart defect
