= Double histone fold =

Protein fold

Identifiers
- Symbol: DHF
- InterPro: IPR015207
Available protein structures:
- PDB: IPR015207
- AlphaFold: IPR015207

The double histone fold is a tertiary fold usually (but not exclusively) found in proteins that bind DNAs, such as archaeal histones. This fold is composed of distinct alpha helical segments organized in pairs of triplets that fold intramolecularly to give place to a globular assembly structurally similar to a histone dimer.

Double histone fold proteins are relatively rare. The fold is quite versatile in that it can mediate various functions, either related or unrelated to chromatin organization. They can function as intramolecular modulator of enzyme activity, transcription factors, and proteins related to viral pathogenicity in addition to the traditional role.

== History ==
The double histone fold was first described by Dr. Slesarev and coworkers in 2001. He and coworkers were the first to deduce the structure of Methanopyrus kandleri histone and characterized the structural motif within this protein which would later be called the double histone fold. It was subsequently found that very diverse proteins, such as viral proteins and eukaryotic multidomain proteins contain this same structurally conserved double histone fold motif.
