= H1F0 =

Protein found in humans

H1-0

Identifiers
- Aliases: H1-0, H1FV, H1 histone family member 0, H1.0, H1.0 linker histone, H1F0
- External IDs: OMIM: 142708; MGI: 95893; GeneCards: H1-0

Gene location (Human)
Chr.	Chromosome 22 (human)
Band	22q13.1	Start	37,805,229 bp
Band	22q13.1	End	37,807,432 bp

Gene location (Mouse)
Chr.	Chromosome 15 (mouse)
Band	15 E1|15 37.7 cM	Start	78,912,650 bp
Band	15 E1|15 37.7 cM	End	78,914,704 bp
RNA expression pattern
Bgee	Human / Mouse (ortholog); Top expressed in: ventricular zone; ganglionic eminence; skin of leg; skin of abdomen; olfactory zone of nasal mucosa; right uterine tube; islet of Langerhans; ectocervix; mucosa of transverse colon; left uterine tube / Top expressed in: medial ganglionic eminence; vestibular sensory epithelium; molar; ventricular zone; efferent ductule; dermis; hand; Gonadal ridge; migratory enteric neural crest cell; saccule; More reference expression data
BioGPS	n/a
Gene ontology
Molecular function	DNA binding; chromatin DNA binding; protein binding; RNA binding; minor groove of adenine-thymine-rich DNA binding; double-stranded DNA binding; nucleosomal DNA binding
Cellular component	actin cytoskeleton; chromosome; nucleosome; Golgi apparatus; nucleus; nucleoplasm; nuclear body; transcription repressor complex
Biological process	nucleosome assembly; apoptotic DNA fragmentation; negative regulation of transcription by RNA polymerase II; regulation of transcription, DNA-templated; chromosome condensation; negative regulation of DNA recombination; positive regulation of transcription regulatory region DNA binding
Sources:Amigo / QuickGO
Orthologs
Databases	NCBI: entry; OMA: entry
Species	Human	Mouse
Entrez	3005	14958
Ensembl	ENSG00000189060	ENSMUSG00000096210
UniProt	P07305	P10922
RefSeq (mRNA)	NM_005318	NM_008197
RefSeq (protein)	NP_005309	NP_032223
Location (UCSC)	Chr 22: 37.81 – 37.81 Mb	Chr 15: 78.91 – 78.91 Mb
PubMed search
- Wikidata
View/Edit Human	View/Edit Mouse

H1 histone family, member 0 is a member of the histone family of nuclear proteins which are a component of chromatin. In humans, this protein is encoded by the H1F0 gene.
