= HIST1H4G =

Protein-coding gene in the species Homo sapiens

H4C7

Identifiers
- Aliases: H4C7, H4/l, H4FL, histone cluster 1, H4g, histone cluster 1 H4 family member g, H4 clustered histone 7, HIST1H4G
- External IDs: OMIM: 602832; GeneCards: H4C7

Gene location (Human)
Chr.	Chromosome 6 (human)
Band	6p22.2	Start	26,246,611 bp
Band	6p22.2	End	26,246,996 bp
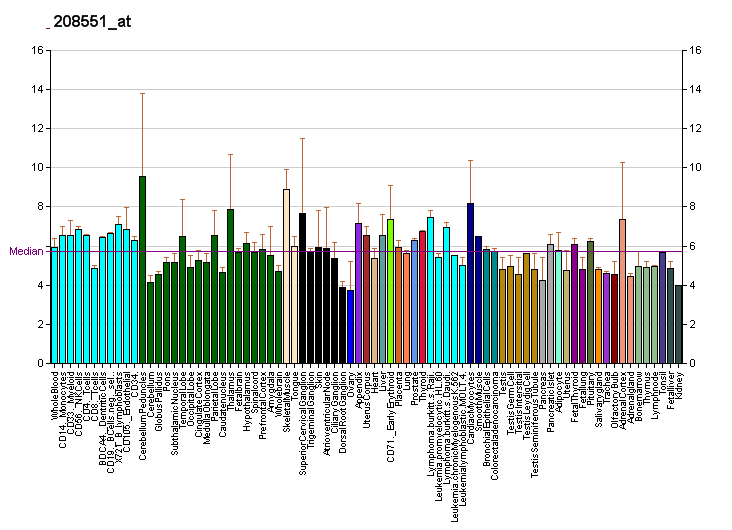
RNA expression pattern
Bgee	Human / Mouse (ortholog); Top expressed in: tibialis anterior muscle; optic nerve; deltoid muscle; cell; somatic cell; mononuclear cell; cerebral cortex; monocyte; rectum; small intestine / n/a; More reference expression data
BioGPS	More reference expression data
Gene ontology
Molecular function	protein binding; protein heterodimerization activity; DNA binding; histone binding; molecular function
Cellular component	nucleosome; nucleus; chromosome
Biological process	nucleosome assembly; biological process
Sources:Amigo / QuickGO
Orthologs
Databases	NCBI: entry; OMA: entry
Species	Human	Mouse
Entrez	8369	n/a
Ensembl	ENSG00000275663	n/a
UniProt	Q99525	n/a
RefSeq (mRNA)	NM_003547	n/a
RefSeq (protein)	NP_003538	n/a
Location (UCSC)	Chr 6: 26.25 – 26.25 Mb	n/a
PubMed search		n/a
- Wikidata
View/Edit Human

Histone H4-like protein type G is a protein that in humans is encoded by the HIST1H4G gene.

Histones are basic nuclear proteins that are responsible for the nucleosome structure of the chromosomal fiber in eukaryotes. Two molecules of each of the four core histones (H2A, H2B, H3, and H4) form an octamer, around which approximately 146 bp of DNA is wrapped in repeating units, called nucleosomes. The linker histone, H1, interacts with linker DNA between nucleosomes and functions in the compaction of chromatin into higher order structures. This gene is intronless and encodes a member of the histone H4 family. Transcripts from this gene lack polyA tails but instead contain a palindromic termination element. This gene is found in the large histone gene cluster on chromosome 6.
