= HIST1H2BJ =

Protein-coding gene in the species Homo sapiens

H2BC11
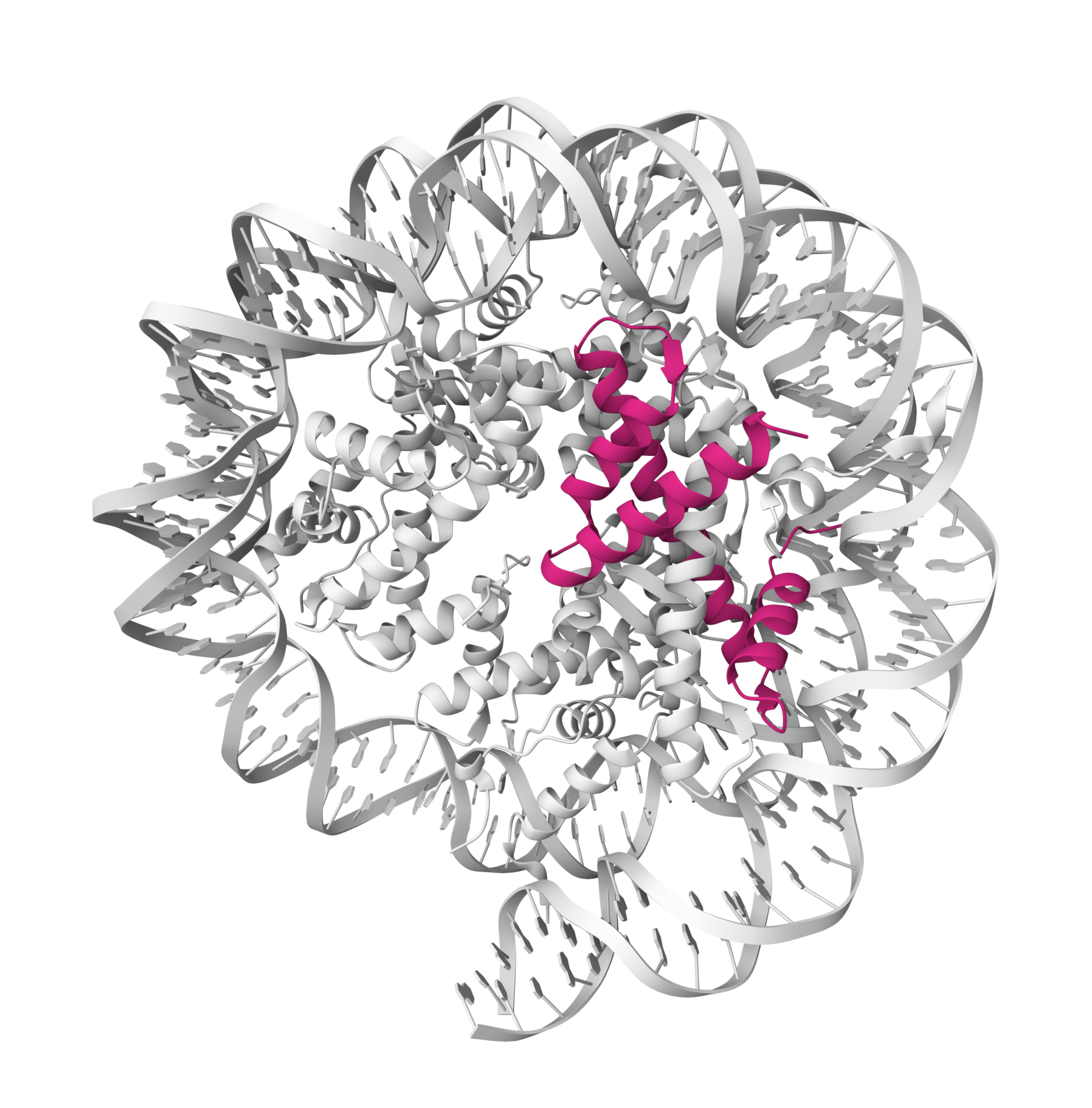

Identifiers
- Aliases: H2BC11, H2B/r, H2BFR, H2BJ, histone cluster 1, H2bj, histone cluster 1 H2B family member j, H2B clustered histone 11, HIST1H2BJ
- External IDs: OMIM: 615044; MGI: 2448415; GeneCards: H2BC11
Available structures
PDB	Ortholog search: PDBe RCSB
PDB	List of PDB id codes 3A6N, 3AFA, 3AN2, 3AV1, 3AV2, 3AYW, 3AZE, 3AZF, 3AZG, 3AZH, 3AZI, 3AZJ, 3AZK, 3AZL, 3AZM, 3AZN, 3W96, 3W97, 3W98, 3W99, 3WA9, 3WAA, 3WTP, 4CAY, 5CPJ, 5B0Z, 4YM5, 5AV9, 5AVB, 5AV5, 4YM6, 5CPI, 5AV6, 5AV8, 5CPK, 5AVC, 5B0Y, 4Z5T, 5FUG, 5B24, 2RVQ, 5AY8, 5B2I, 5B40, 5B2J

Gene location (Human)
Chr.	Chromosome 6 (human)
Band	6p22.1	Start	27,125,897 bp
Band	6p22.1	End	27,132,795 bp

Gene location (Mouse)
Chr.	Chromosome 3 (mouse)
Band	3|3 F2.1	Start	96,128,435 bp
Band	3|3 F2.1	End	96,131,054 bp
RNA expression pattern
Bgee	Human / Mouse (ortholog); Top expressed in: bone marrow cell; monocyte; testicle; Achilles tendon; gonad; left testis; right testis; blood; granulocyte; corpus callosum / Top expressed in: olfactory epithelium; otolith organ; utricle; ciliary body; iris; vestibular membrane of cochlear duct; conjunctival fornix; pineal gland; ascending aorta; Paneth cell; More reference expression data
BioGPS	n/a
Gene ontology
Molecular function	protein heterodimerization activity; DNA binding; lipopolysaccharide binding; protein binding
Cellular component	nucleosome; nucleus; chromosome; nucleoplasm; extracellular space; cytosol; plasma membrane
Biological process	nucleosome assembly; innate immune response in mucosa; defense response to bacterium; protein ubiquitination; negative regulation of tumor necrosis factor-mediated signaling pathway; antimicrobial humoral immune response mediated by antimicrobial peptide
Sources:Amigo / QuickGO
Orthologs
Databases	NCBI: entry; OMA: entry
Species	Human	Mouse
Entrez	8970	319190
Ensembl	ENSG00000124635	ENSMUSG00000068854
UniProt	P06899	Q64524
RefSeq (mRNA)	NM_021058	NM_178214
RefSeq (protein)	NP_066402	NP_835586
Location (UCSC)	Chr 6: 27.13 – 27.13 Mb	Chr 3: 96.13 – 96.13 Mb
PubMed search
- Wikidata
View/Edit Human	View/Edit Mouse

Histone H2B type 1-J is a protein that in humans is encoded by the HIST1H2BJ gene.

Histones are basic nuclear proteins that are responsible for the nucleosome structure of the chromosomal fiber in eukaryotes. Two molecules of each of the four core histones (H2A, H2B, H3, and H4) form an octamer, around which approximately 146 bp of DNA is wrapped in repeating units, called nucleosomes. The linker histone, H1, interacts with linker DNA between nucleosomes and functions in the compaction of chromatin into higher order structures. This gene is intronless and encodes a member of the histone H2B family. Transcripts from this gene lack polyA tails but instead contain a palindromic termination element. This gene is found in the histone microcluster on chromosome 6p21.33.
