= HIST1H1B =

Protein-coding gene in the species Homo sapiens

H1-5
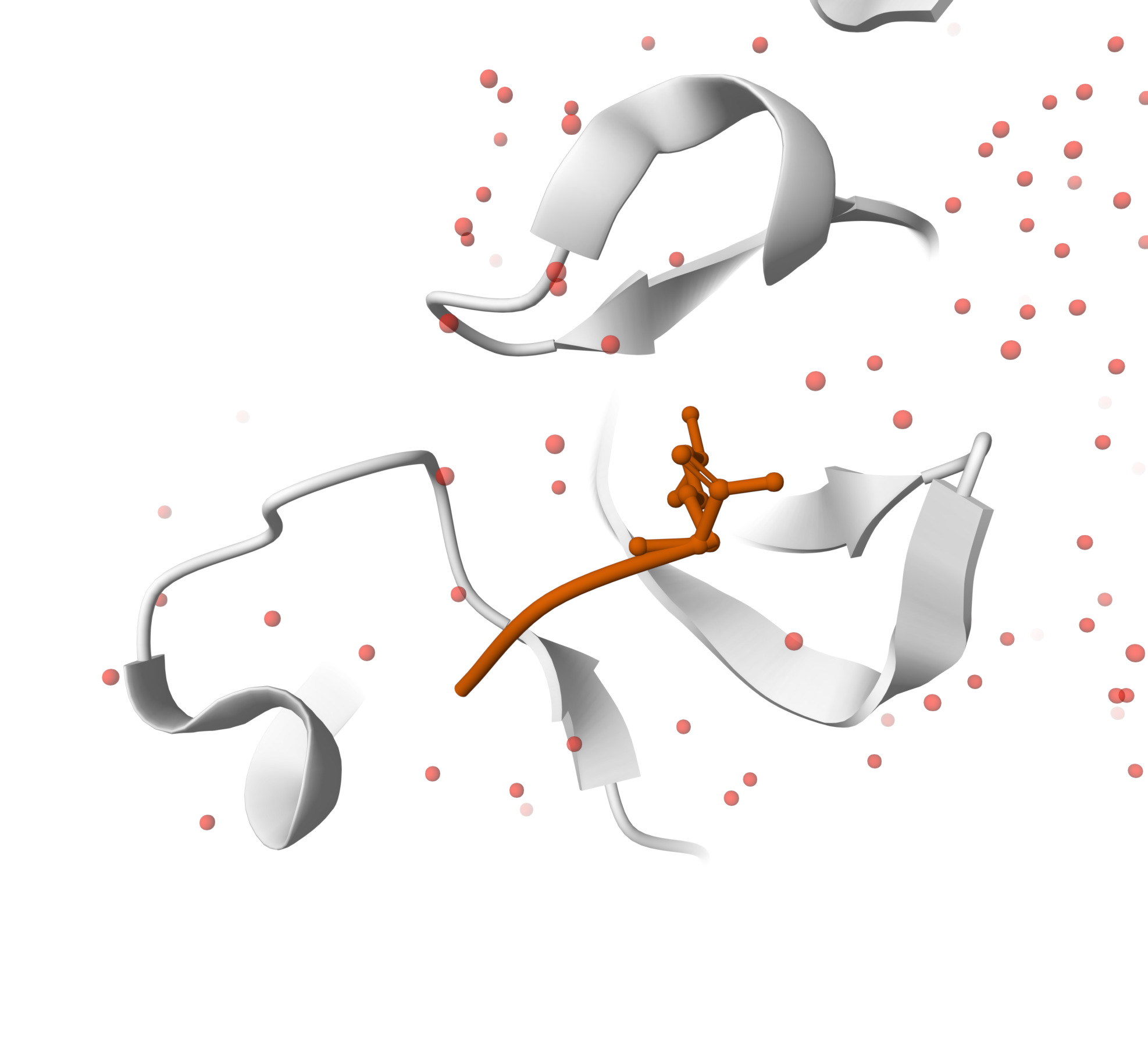

Identifiers
- Aliases: H1-5, H1, H1.5, H1B, H1F5, H1s-3, histone cluster 1, H1b, histone cluster 1 H1 family member b, HIST1H1B, H1.5 linker histone, cluster member
- External IDs: OMIM: 142711; MGI: 1861461; GeneCards: H1-5
Available structures
PDB	Ortholog search: PDBe RCSB
PDB	List of PDB id codes 2RHI

Gene location (Human)
Chr.	Chromosome 6 (human)
Band	6p22.1	Start	27,866,792 bp
Band	6p22.1	End	27,867,588 bp

Gene location (Mouse)
Chr.	Chromosome 13 (mouse)
Band	13|13 A3.1	Start	21,964,053 bp
Band	13|13 A3.1	End	21,964,795 bp
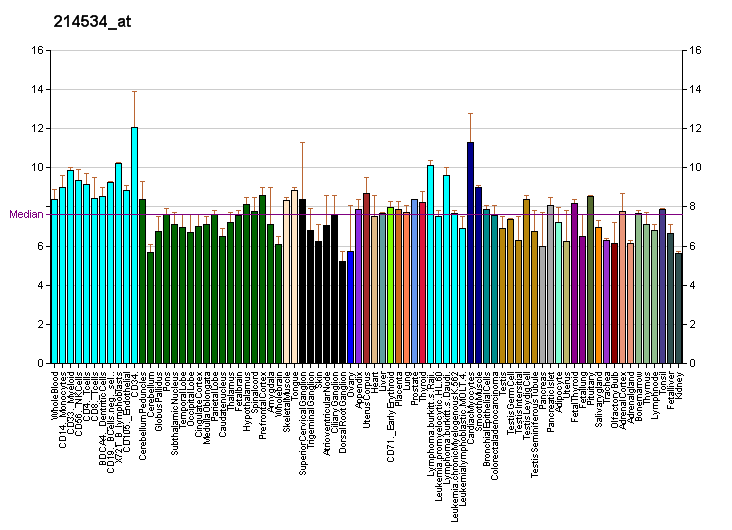
RNA expression pattern
Bgee	Human / Mouse (ortholog); Top expressed in: bone marrow cell; epithelium of colon; testicle; ventricular zone; tendon; Achilles tendon; ganglionic eminence; tonsil; mucosa of transverse colon; monocyte / Top expressed in: uterus; genital tubercle; tail of embryo; blastocyst; embryo; embryo; bone marrow; gray matter layer of cerebellum; morula; yolk sac; More reference expression data
BioGPS	More reference expression data
Gene ontology
Molecular function	DNA binding; histone deacetylase binding; chromatin DNA binding; RNA binding; protein binding; double-stranded DNA binding; nucleosomal DNA binding
Cellular component	nucleosome; extracellular exosome; chromosome; nucleus
Biological process	establishment of protein localization to chromatin; nucleosome assembly; protein stabilization; positive regulation of cell growth; negative regulation of transcription by RNA polymerase II; chromatin organization; positive regulation of histone H3-K9 methylation; regulation of transcription, DNA-templated; chromosome condensation; negative regulation of DNA recombination; muscle organ development
Sources:Amigo / QuickGO
Orthologs
Databases	NCBI: entry; OMA: entry
Species	Human	Mouse
Entrez	3009	56702
Ensembl	ENSG00000184357	ENSMUSG00000058773
UniProt	P16401	P43276
RefSeq (mRNA)	NM_005322	NM_020034
RefSeq (protein)	NP_005313	NP_064418
Location (UCSC)	Chr 6: 27.87 – 27.87 Mb	Chr 13: 21.96 – 21.96 Mb
PubMed search
- Wikidata
View/Edit Human	View/Edit Mouse

Histone H1.5 is a protein that in humans is encoded by the HIST1H1B gene.

Histones are basic nuclear proteins responsible for nucleosome structure of the chromosomal fiber in eukaryotes. Two molecules of each of the four core histones (H2A, H2B, H3, and H4) form an octamer, around which approximately 146 bp of DNA is wrapped in repeating units, called nucleosomes. The linker histone, H1, interacts with linker DNA between nucleosomes and functions in the compaction of chromatin into higher order structures. This gene is intronless and encodes a member of the histone H1 family. Transcripts from this gene lack polyA tails but instead contain a palindromic termination element. This gene is found in the small histone gene cluster on chromosome 6p22-p21.3.
