= HIST1H2AG =

Protein-coding gene in the species Homo sapiens

H2AC11
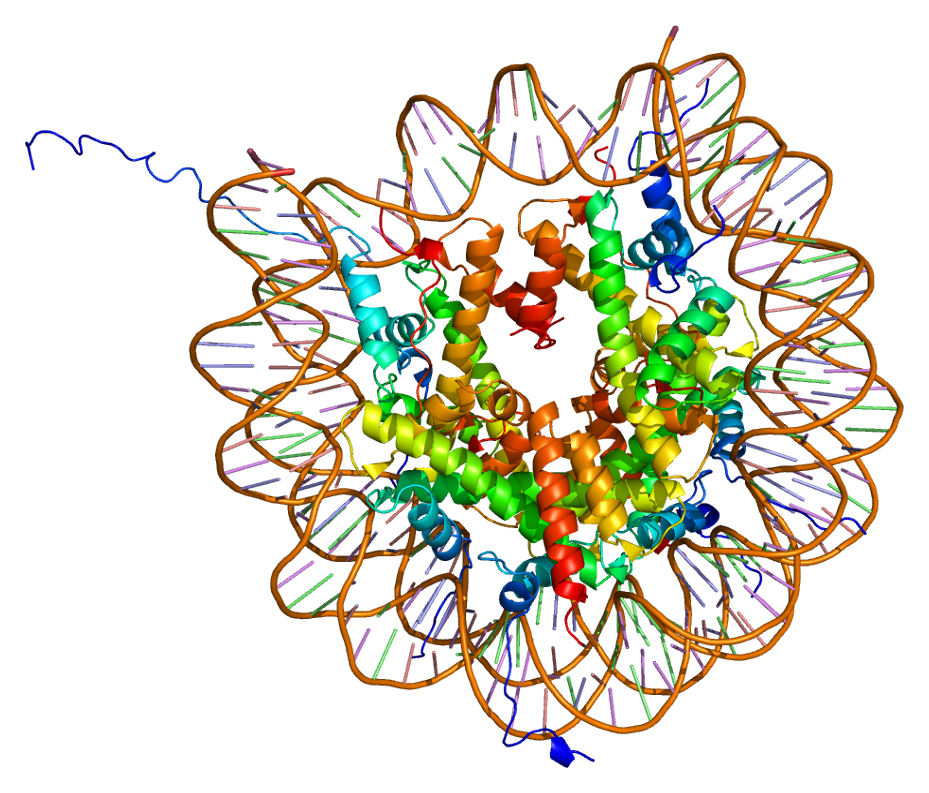

Identifiers
- Aliases: H2AC11, H2A.1b, H2A/p, H2AFP, H2AG, pH2A/f, histone cluster 1, H2ag, histone cluster 1 H2A family member g, H2A clustered histone 11, HIST1H2AG, H2AC15, H2AC17, H2AC16, H2AC13
- External IDs: OMIM: 615012; MGI: 2448300; GeneCards: H2AC11
Available structures
PDB	Ortholog search: PDBe RCSB
PDB	List of PDB id codes 4QYL, 5KGF

Gene location (Human)
Chr.	Chromosome 6 (human)
Band	6p22.1	Start	27,133,043 bp
Band	6p22.1	End	27,133,535 bp

Gene location (Mouse)
Chr.	Chromosome 13 (mouse)
Band	13|13 A3.1	Start	21,970,996 bp
Band	13|13 A3.1	End	21,971,388 bp
RNA expression pattern
Bgee	Human / Mouse (ortholog); Top expressed in: bone marrow cell; monocyte; testicle; amniotic fluid; gonad; epithelium of colon; jejunal mucosa; ventricular zone; secondary oocyte; blood / Top expressed in: uterus; embryo; embryo; morula; bone marrow; yolk sac; blastocyst; tail of embryo; genital tubercle; spermatocyte; More reference expression data
BioGPS	n/a
Gene ontology
Molecular function	enzyme binding; DNA binding; protein binding; protein heterodimerization activity
Cellular component	nucleosome; extracellular exosome; nucleus; chromosome
Biological process	chromatin organization; biological process
Sources:Amigo / QuickGO
Orthologs
Databases	NCBI: entry; OMA: entry
Species	Human	Mouse
Entrez	8969	319170
Ensembl	ENSG00000196787	ENSMUSG00000069309
UniProt	P0C0S8	C0HKE2; B2RVF0; C0HKE1; C0HKE3; C0HKE4 C0HKE5; C0HKE6; C0HKE7; C0HKE8; C0HKE9
RefSeq (mRNA)	NM_021064	NM_178184
RefSeq (protein)	NP_066408; NP_003505	NP_835496; NP_835495; NP_835494; NP_835491; NP_835489 NP_783591; NP_835493; NP_835496; NP_835489; NP_835495; NP_835494; NP_835491; NP_835492; NP_783591; NP_001171015; NP_835489; NP_001171015; NP_835496; NP_835491; NP_835493; NP_835494; NP_835495; NP_835492; NP_783591; NP_835494; NP_835489; NP_835495; NP_835491; NP_835492; NP_783591; NP_001171015; NP_835493; NP_835496; NP_835495; NP_835489; NP_835494; NP_835491; NP_835492; NP_783591; NP_001171015; NP_835493; NP_835496; NP_835492; NP_835491; NP_835489; NP_835495; NP_835494; NP_783591; NP_001171015; NP_835493; NP_835496; NP_835491; NP_835489; NP_835495; NP_835494; NP_835492; NP_783591; NP_001171015; NP_835493; NP_835496; NP_783591; NP_835489; NP_835495; NP_835494; NP_835491; NP_835492; NP_001171015; NP_835493; NP_835496; NP_783591; NP_835489; NP_835495; NP_835494; NP_835491; NP_835492; NP_001171015; NP_835493; NP_835496
Location (UCSC)	Chr 6: 27.13 – 27.13 Mb	Chr 13: 21.97 – 21.97 Mb
PubMed search
- Wikidata
View/Edit Human	View/Edit Mouse

Histone H2A type 1 is a protein that in humans is encoded by the HIST1H2AG gene.

Histones are basic nuclear proteins that are responsible for the nucleosome structure of the chromosomal fiber in eukaryotes. Two molecules of each of the four core histones (H2A, H2B, H3, and H4) form an octamer, around which approximately 146 bp of DNA is wrapped in repeating units, called nucleosomes. The linker histone, H1, interacts with linker DNA between nucleosomes and functions in the compaction of chromatin into higher order structures. This gene is intronless and encodes a member of the histone H2A family. Transcripts from this gene lack polyA tails but instead contain a palindromic termination element. This gene is found in the histone microcluster on chromosome 6p21.33.
