= HIST1H2BG =

Protein-coding gene in the species Homo sapiens

H2BC8

Identifiers
- Aliases: H2BC8, H2B.1A, H2B/a, H2BFA, dJ221C16.8, histone cluster 1, H2bg, histone cluster 1 H2B family member g, HIST1H2BG, H2B clustered histone 8, H2BC10, H2BC7, H2BC6, H2BC4
- External IDs: OMIM: 602798; MGI: 2448383; GeneCards: H2BC8
Available structures
PDB	Ortholog search: PDBe RCSB
PDB	List of PDB id codes 5KGF

Gene location (Human)
Chr.	Chromosome 6 (human)
Band	6p22.2	Start	26,216,200 bp
Band	6p22.2	End	26,216,688 bp

Gene location (Mouse)
Chr.	Chromosome 13 (mouse)
Band	13|13 A3.1	Start	23,757,910 bp
Band	13|13 A3.1	End	23,758,370 bp
RNA expression pattern
Bgee	Human / Mouse (ortholog); Top expressed in: buccal mucosa cell; thymus; corpus epididymis; bone marrow cell; gonad; amniotic fluid; monocyte; testicle; caput epididymis; epithelium of colon / Top expressed in: uterus; blastocyst; genital tubercle; tail of embryo; embryo; embryo; spermatocyte; yolk sac; zygote; thymus; More reference expression data
BioGPS	n/a
Gene ontology
Molecular function	DNA binding; protein binding; protein heterodimerization activity; identical protein binding
Cellular component	chromosome; nucleosome; extracellular exosome; nucleus; nucleoplasm; extracellular space; cytosol
Biological process	nucleosome assembly; innate immune response in mucosa; defense response to bacterium; protein ubiquitination; antimicrobial humoral immune response mediated by antimicrobial peptide
Sources:Amigo / QuickGO
Orthologs
Databases	NCBI: entry; OMA: entry
Species	Human	Mouse
Entrez	8339	319180
Ensembl	ENSG00000273802	ENSMUSG00000069268
UniProt	P62807	P10853
RefSeq (mRNA)	NM_003518	NM_178195
RefSeq (protein)	NP_003517; NP_001368918	NP_835505; NP_001091448; NP_001300809; NP_001104025; NP_001300807 NP_835502; NP_835506; NP_835508
Location (UCSC)	Chr 6: 26.22 – 26.22 Mb	Chr 13: 23.76 – 23.76 Mb
PubMed search
- Wikidata
View/Edit Human	View/Edit Mouse

Histone H2B type 1-C/E/F/G/I is a protein that in humans is encoded by the HIST1H2BG gene.

Histones are basic nuclear proteins that are responsible for the nucleosome structure of the chromosomal fiber in eukaryotes. Nucleosomes consist of approximately 146 bp of DNA wrapped around a histone octamer composed of pairs of each of the four core histones (H2A, H2B, H3, and H4). The chromatin fiber is further compacted through the interaction of a linker histone, H1, with the DNA between the nucleosomes to form higher order chromatin structures. This gene is intronless and encodes a member of the histone H2B family. Transcripts from this gene lack polyA tails; instead, they contain a palindromic termination element. This gene is found in the large histone gene cluster on chromosome 6p22-p21.3.
