= HIST1H2BM =

Protein-coding gene in the species Homo sapiens

H2BC14

Identifiers
- Aliases: H2BC14, H2B/e, H2BFE, dJ160A22.3, histone cluster 1, H2bm, histone cluster 1 H2B family member m, HIST1H2BM, H2B clustered histone 14
- External IDs: OMIM: 602802; MGI: 2448407; GeneCards: H2BC14

Gene location (Human)
Chr.	Chromosome 6 (human)
Band	6p22.1	Start	27,815,022 bp
Band	6p22.1	End	27,815,489 bp

Gene location (Mouse)
Chr.	Chromosome 13 (mouse)
Band	13|13 A3.1	Start	21,938,293 bp
Band	13|13 A3.1	End	21,938,673 bp
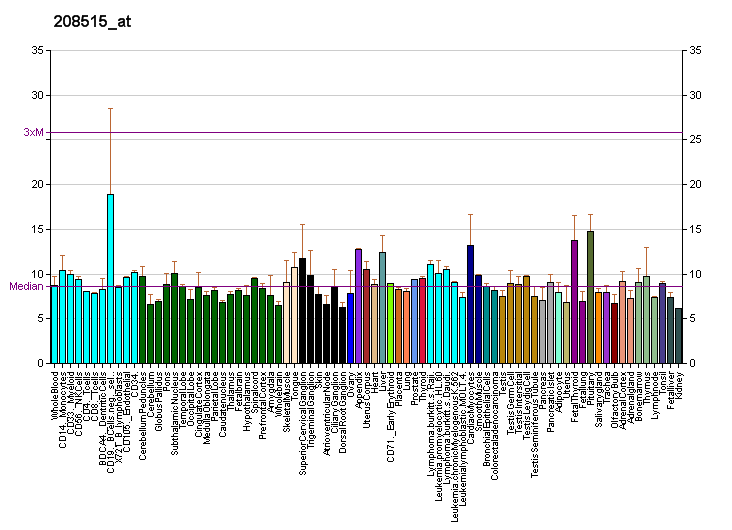
RNA expression pattern
Bgee	Human / Mouse (ortholog); Top expressed in: bone marrow cell; ventricular zone; epithelium of colon; tonsil; thymus; ganglionic eminence; mucosa of transverse colon; blood; lymph node; corpus callosum / Top expressed in: genital tubercle; uterus; spermatid; bone marrow; embryo; embryo; spermatocyte; primary oocyte; tail of embryo; thymus; More reference expression data
BioGPS	More reference expression data
Gene ontology
Molecular function	protein heterodimerization activity; DNA binding
Cellular component	nucleosome; nucleus; chromosome; extracellular exosome; nucleoplasm; cytosol
Biological process	nucleosome assembly; protein ubiquitination
Sources:Amigo / QuickGO
Orthologs
Databases	NCBI: entry; OMA: entry
Species	Human	Mouse
Entrez	8342	319187
Ensembl	ENSG00000273703	ENSMUSG00000095217
UniProt	Q99879	P10853
RefSeq (mRNA)	NM_003521	NM_178201
RefSeq (protein)	NP_003512	NP_835505; NP_001091448; NP_001300809; NP_001104025; NP_001300807 NP_835502; NP_835506; NP_835508
Location (UCSC)	Chr 6: 27.82 – 27.82 Mb	Chr 13: 21.94 – 21.94 Mb
PubMed search
- Wikidata
View/Edit Human	View/Edit Mouse

Histone H2B type 1-M is a protein that in humans is encoded by the HIST1H2BM gene.

Histones are basic nuclear proteins that are responsible for the nucleosome structure of the chromosomal fiber in eukaryotes. Two molecules of each of the four core histones (H2A, H2B, H3, and H4) form an octamer, around which approximately 146 bp of DNA is wrapped in repeating units, called nucleosomes. The linker histone, H1, interacts with linker DNA between nucleosomes and functions in the compaction of chromatin into higher order structures. This gene is intronless and encodes a member of the histone H2B family. Transcripts from this gene lack polyA tails but instead contain a palindromic termination element. This gene is found in the small histone gene cluster on chromosome 6p22-p21.3.
