= H2BFWT =

Protein-coding gene in the species Homo sapiens

H2BW1

Identifiers
- Aliases: H2BW1, H2B histone family member W, testis specific, H2BFWT, H2B.W histone 1, TH2B-175
- External IDs: OMIM: 300507; GeneCards: H2BW1

Gene location (Human)
| Chr. | X chromosome (human) |
| Band | Xq22.2 | Start | 104,011,147 bp |
| Band | Xq22.2 | End | 104,013,708 bp |
RNA expression pattern
| Bgee | Human / Mouse (ortholog); Top expressed in: testicle; right testis; placenta; left testis; right coronary artery; prefrontal cortex; tonsil; superior frontal gyrus; blood / n/a; More reference expression data |
| BioGPS | n/a |
Gene ontology
| Molecular function | DNA binding; protein heterodimerization activity |
| Cellular component | nucleosome; nuclear membrane; membrane; nucleus; chromosome |
| Biological process | nucleosome assembly |
Sources:Amigo / QuickGO
Orthologs
| Databases | NCBI: entry; OMA: entry |
| Species | Human | Mouse |
| Entrez | 158983 | n/a |
| Ensembl | ENSG00000123569 | n/a |
| UniProt | Q7Z2G1 | n/a |
| RefSeq (mRNA) | NM_001002916 | n/a |
| RefSeq (protein) | NP_001002916 | n/a |
| Location (UCSC) | Chr X: 104.01 – 104.01 Mb | n/a |
| PubMed search | | n/a |
- Wikidata
| View/Edit Human |

H2B histone family, member W, testis-specific is a protein that in humans is encoded by the H2BFWT gene.

Histones are basic nuclear proteins that are responsible for the nucleosome structure of the chromosomal fiber in eukaryotes. Two molecules of each of the four core histones (H2A, H2B, H3, and H4) form an octamer, around which approximately 146 bp of DNA is wrapped in repeating units, called nucleosomes. The linker histone, H1, interacts with linker DNA between nucleosomes and functions in the compaction of chromatin into higher order structures. This gene encodes a member of the H2B histone family that is specifically expressed in sperm nuclei. A polymorphism in the 5' UTR of this gene is associated with male infertility.[provided by RefSeq, Jan 2010].
