= HIST1H2AJ =

Protein-coding gene in the species Homo sapiens

H2AC14

Identifiers
- Aliases: H2AC14, H2A/E, H2AFE, dJ160A22.4, histone cluster 1, H2aj, histone cluster 1 H2A family member j, H2A clustered histone 14, HIST1H2AJ
- External IDs: OMIM: 602791; MGI: 2448309; GeneCards: H2AC14

Gene location (Human)
Chr.	Chromosome 6 (human)
Band	6p22.1	Start	27,814,302 bp
Band	6p22.1	End	27,814,777 bp

Gene location (Mouse)
Chr.	Chromosome 13 (mouse)
Band	13|13 A3.1	Start	23,718,076 bp
Band	13|13 A3.1	End	23,718,474 bp
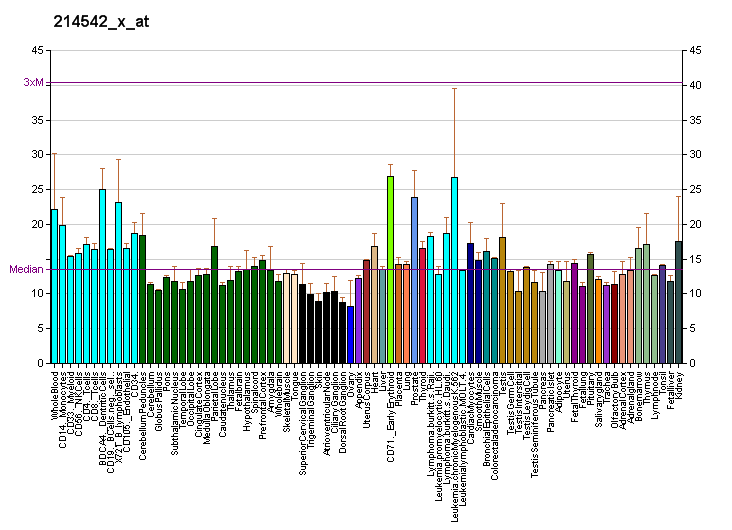

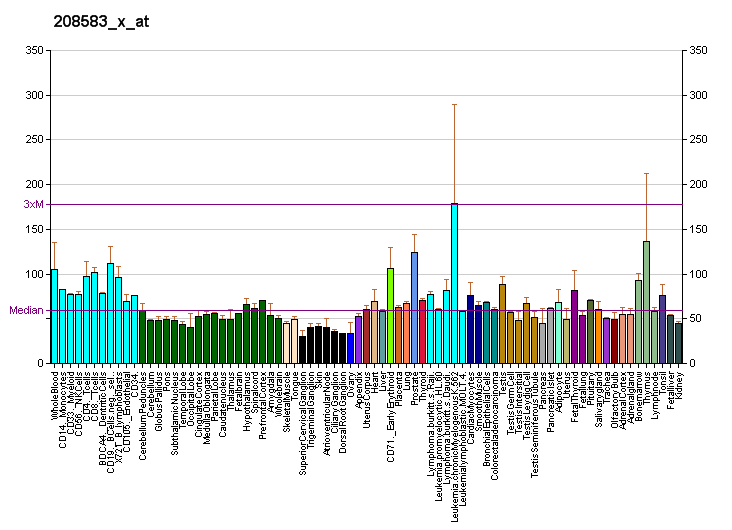
RNA expression pattern
Bgee	Human / Mouse (ortholog); Top expressed in: bone marrow cell; testicle; gonad; epithelium of colon; Achilles tendon; tonsil; mucosa of transverse colon; ganglionic eminence; blood; sural nerve / Top expressed in: uterus; bone marrow; thymus; yolk sac; spleen; embryo; genital tubercle; embryo; lens; granulocyte; More reference expression data
BioGPS	More reference expression data
Gene ontology
Molecular function	DNA binding; protein heterodimerization activity; molecular function
Cellular component	nucleosome; extracellular exosome; nucleus; chromosome
Biological process	chromatin organization; biological process
Sources:Amigo / QuickGO
Orthologs
Databases	NCBI: entry; OMA: entry
Species	Human	Mouse
Entrez	8331	319173
Ensembl	ENSG00000276368	ENSMUSG00000061991
UniProt	Q99878	Q8CGP5
RefSeq (mRNA)	NM_021066	NM_175661
RefSeq (protein)	NP_066544	NP_783592
Location (UCSC)	Chr 6: 27.81 – 27.81 Mb	Chr 13: 23.72 – 23.72 Mb
PubMed search
- Wikidata
View/Edit Human	View/Edit Mouse

Histone H2A type 1-J is a protein that in humans is encoded by the HIST1H2AJ gene.

Histones are basic nuclear proteins that are responsible for the nucleosome structure of the chromosomal fiber in eukaryotes. Two molecules of each of the four core histones (H2A, H2B, H3, and H4) form an octamer, around which approximately 146 bp of DNA is wrapped in repeating units, called nucleosomes. The linker histone, H1, interacts with linker DNA between nucleosomes and functions in the compaction of chromatin into higher order structures. This gene is intronless and encodes a member of the histone H2A family. Transcripts from this gene lack polyA tails but instead contain a palindromic termination element. This gene is found in the small histone gene cluster on chromosome 6p22-p21.3.
