= HIST1H2AD =

Protein-coding gene in the species Homo sapiens

H2AC7

Identifiers
- Aliases: H2AC7, H2A.3, H2A/g, H2AFG, histone cluster 1, H2ad, histone cluster 1 H2A family member d, H2A clustered histone 7, HIST1H2AD
- External IDs: OMIM: 602792; MGI: 2448306; GeneCards: H2AC7

Gene location (Human)
Chr.	Chromosome 6 (human)
Band	6p22.2	Start	26,198,784 bp
Band	6p22.2	End	26,199,293 bp

Gene location (Mouse)
Chr.	Chromosome 13 (mouse)
Band	13|13 A3.1	Start	23,935,109 bp
Band	13|13 A3.1	End	23,935,581 bp
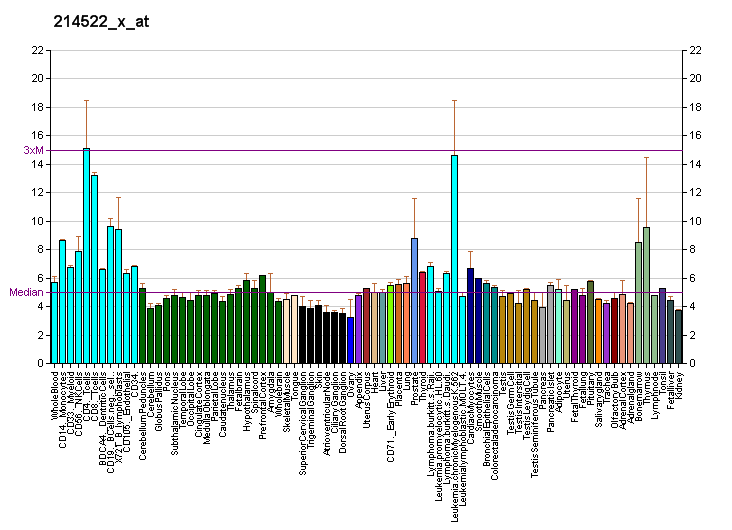
RNA expression pattern
Bgee	Human / Mouse (ortholog); Top expressed in: bone marrow cell; testicle; corpus callosum; gonad; Achilles tendon; epithelium of colon; blood; tonsil; granulocyte; vagina / Top expressed in: uterus; genital tubercle; embryo; embryo; bone marrow; mesencephalon; tail of embryo; spermatid; yolk sac; blastocyst; More reference expression data
BioGPS	More reference expression data
Gene ontology
Molecular function	DNA binding; protein heterodimerization activity; molecular function
Cellular component	nucleosome; extracellular exosome; nucleus; chromosome
Biological process	chromatin organization; biological process
Sources:Amigo / QuickGO
Orthologs
Databases	NCBI: entry; OMA: entry
Species	Human	Mouse
Entrez	3013	319172
Ensembl	ENSG00000196866	ENSMUSG00000061615
UniProt	P20671	C0HKE2; B2RVF0; C0HKE1; C0HKE3; C0HKE4 C0HKE5; C0HKE6; C0HKE7; C0HKE8; C0HKE9
RefSeq (mRNA)	NM_021065	NM_175660
RefSeq (protein)	NP_066409	NP_835496; NP_835495; NP_835494; NP_835491; NP_835489 NP_783591; NP_835493; NP_835496; NP_835489; NP_835495; NP_835494; NP_835491; NP_835492; NP_783591; NP_001171015; NP_835489; NP_001171015; NP_835496; NP_835491; NP_835493; NP_835494; NP_835495; NP_835492; NP_783591; NP_835494; NP_835489; NP_835495; NP_835491; NP_835492; NP_783591; NP_001171015; NP_835493; NP_835496; NP_835495; NP_835489; NP_835494; NP_835491; NP_835492; NP_783591; NP_001171015; NP_835493; NP_835496; NP_835492; NP_835491; NP_835489; NP_835495; NP_835494; NP_783591; NP_001171015; NP_835493; NP_835496; NP_835491; NP_835489; NP_835495; NP_835494; NP_835492; NP_783591; NP_001171015; NP_835493; NP_835496; NP_783591; NP_835489; NP_835495; NP_835494; NP_835491; NP_835492; NP_001171015; NP_835493; NP_835496; NP_783591; NP_835489; NP_835495; NP_835494; NP_835491; NP_835492; NP_001171015; NP_835493; NP_835496
Location (UCSC)	Chr 6: 26.2 – 26.2 Mb	Chr 13: 23.94 – 23.94 Mb
PubMed search
- Wikidata
View/Edit Human	View/Edit Mouse

Histone H2A type 1-D is a protein that in humans is encoded by the HIST1H2AD gene.

Histones are basic nuclear proteins that are responsible for the nucleosome structure of the chromosomal fiber in eukaryotes. This structure consists of approximately 146 bp of DNA wrapped around a nucleosome, an octamer composed of pairs of each of the four core histones (H2A, H2B, H3, and H4). The chromatin fiber is further compacted through the interaction of a linker histone, H1, with the DNA between the nucleosomes to form higher order chromatin structures. This gene is intronless and encodes a member of the histone H2A family. Transcripts from this gene lack polyA tails; instead, they contain a palindromic termination element. This gene is found in the large histone gene cluster on chromosome 6p22-p21.3.
