= H2BFM =

Protein-coding gene in the species Homo sapiens

H2BW2

Identifiers
- Aliases: H2BW2, H2B histone family member M, H2B.W histone 2, H2BM, H2BFM
- External IDs: MGI: 1916639; GeneCards: H2BW2

Gene location (Human)
| Chr. | X chromosome (human) |
| Band | Xq22.2 | Start | 104,039,956 bp |
| Band | Xq22.2 | End | 104,042,454 bp |

Gene location (Mouse)
| Chr. | X chromosome (mouse) |
| Band | X|X F1 | Start | 135,828,074 bp |
| Band | X|X F1 | End | 135,829,125 bp |
RNA expression pattern
| Bgee | Human / Mouse (ortholog); Top expressed in: testicle; cerebellar hemisphere; right hemisphere of cerebellum; ganglionic eminence; right ovary; ventricular zone; left ovary; stromal cell of endometrium; canal of the cervix; Descending thoracic aorta / Top expressed in: spermatid; spermatocyte; More reference expression data |
| BioGPS | n/a |
Gene ontology
| Molecular function | protein heterodimerization activity; DNA binding |
| Cellular component | nucleosome; nucleus; chromosome |
| Biological process | nucleosome assembly |
Sources:Amigo / QuickGO
Orthologs
| Databases | NCBI: entry; OMA: entry |
| Species | Human | Mouse |
| Entrez | 286436 | 69389 |
| Ensembl | ENSG00000101812 | ENSMUSG00000048155 |
| UniProt | P0C1H6 | Q9DAB5 |
| RefSeq (mRNA) | NM_001164416; NM_001377073; NM_001388464 | NM_027067 |
| RefSeq (protein) | NP_001157888; NP_001364002 | NP_081343 |
| Location (UCSC) | Chr X: 104.04 – 104.04 Mb | Chr X: 135.83 – 135.83 Mb |
| PubMed search |
- Wikidata
| View/Edit Human | View/Edit Mouse |

H2B histone family, member M is a protein that in humans is encoded by the H2BFM gene.
