= HIST1H1C =

Protein-coding gene in the species Homo sapiens

H1-2

Identifiers
- Aliases: H1-2, H1.2, H1C, H1F2, H1s-1, histone cluster 1, H1c, histone cluster 1 H1 family member c, HIST1H1C, H1.2 linker histone, cluster member
- External IDs: OMIM: 142710; MGI: 1931526; GeneCards: H1-2

Gene location (Human)
| Chr. | Chromosome 6 (human) |
| Band | 6p22.2 | Start | 26,055,740 bp |
| Band | 6p22.2 | End | 26,056,470 bp |

Gene location (Mouse)
| Chr. | Chromosome 13 (mouse) |
| Band | 13|13 A3.1 | Start | 23,922,791 bp |
| Band | 13|13 A3.1 | End | 23,924,350 bp |
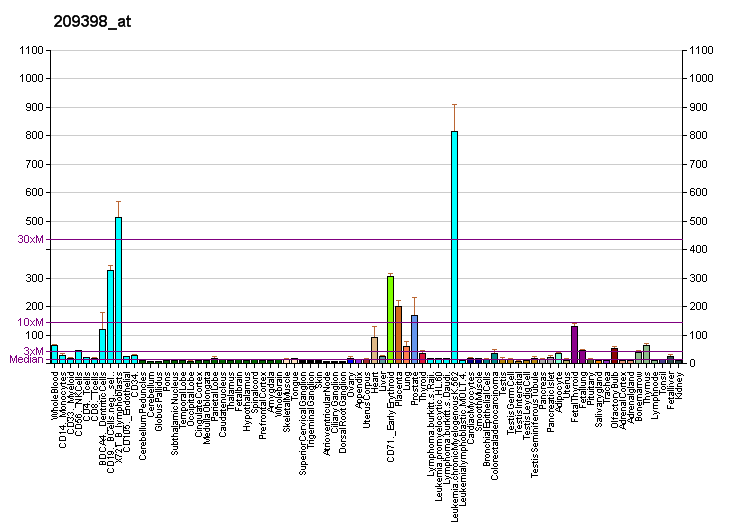
RNA expression pattern
| Bgee | Human / Mouse (ortholog); Top expressed in: Achilles tendon; mucosa of transverse colon; epithelium of colon; apex of heart; gastrocnemius muscle; muscle of thigh; right uterine tube; left ventricle; gonad; right lobe of liver / Top expressed in: calvaria; Epithelium of choroid plexus; left colon; ankle; blood; stroma of bone marrow; vastus lateralis muscle; triceps brachii muscle; seminal vesicula; submandibular gland; More reference expression data |
| BioGPS | More reference expression data |
Gene ontology
| Molecular function | DNA binding; chromatin DNA binding; protein binding; RNA binding; double-stranded DNA binding; nucleosomal DNA binding |
| Cellular component | nucleosome; nucleus; chromosome |
| Biological process | regulation of transcription by RNA polymerase II; histone H3-K4 trimethylation; nucleosome assembly; negative regulation of transcription by RNA polymerase II; histone H3-K27 trimethylation; regulation of transcription, DNA-templated; chromosome condensation; negative regulation of DNA recombination |
Sources:Amigo / QuickGO
Orthologs
| Databases | NCBI: entry; OMA: entry |
| Species | Human | Mouse |
| Entrez | 3006 | 50708 |
| Ensembl | ENSG00000187837 | ENSMUSG00000036181 |
| UniProt | P16403 | P15864 |
| RefSeq (mRNA) | NM_005319 | NM_015786 |
| RefSeq (protein) | NP_005310 | NP_056601 |
| Location (UCSC) | Chr 6: 26.06 – 26.06 Mb | Chr 13: 23.92 – 23.92 Mb |
| PubMed search |
- Wikidata
| View/Edit Human | View/Edit Mouse |

Histone H1.2 is a protein that in humans is encoded by the HIST1H1C gene.

Histones are basic nuclear proteins responsible for nucleosome structure of the chromosomal fiber in eukaryotes. Two molecules of each of the four core histones (H2A, H2B, H3, and H4) form an octamer, around which approximately 146 bp of DNA is wrapped in repeating units, called nucleosomes. The linker histone, H1, interacts with linker DNA between nucleosomes and functions in the compaction of chromatin into higher order structures. This gene is intronless and encodes a member of the histone H1 family. Transcripts from this gene lack polyA tails but instead contain a palindromic termination element. This gene is found in the large histone gene cluster on chromosome 6.

Apart from its roles in the nucleus, histone H1.2 also participates in apoptosis. In response to apoptotic stimuli, mainly DNA damage, it is translocated from the nucleus to the cytosol. There, it activates Bak, a pro-apoptotic protein bound to the mithochondria outer membrane (MOM). Activation of Bak causes the perforation of the mitochondria, a process known as MOMP (mitochondria outer membrane permeabilization) which promotes apoptosis. Histone H1.2 also forms a complex with the apoptosome, possibly regulating its formation.
