= HIST1H1A =

Protein-coding gene in the species Homo sapiens

H1-1
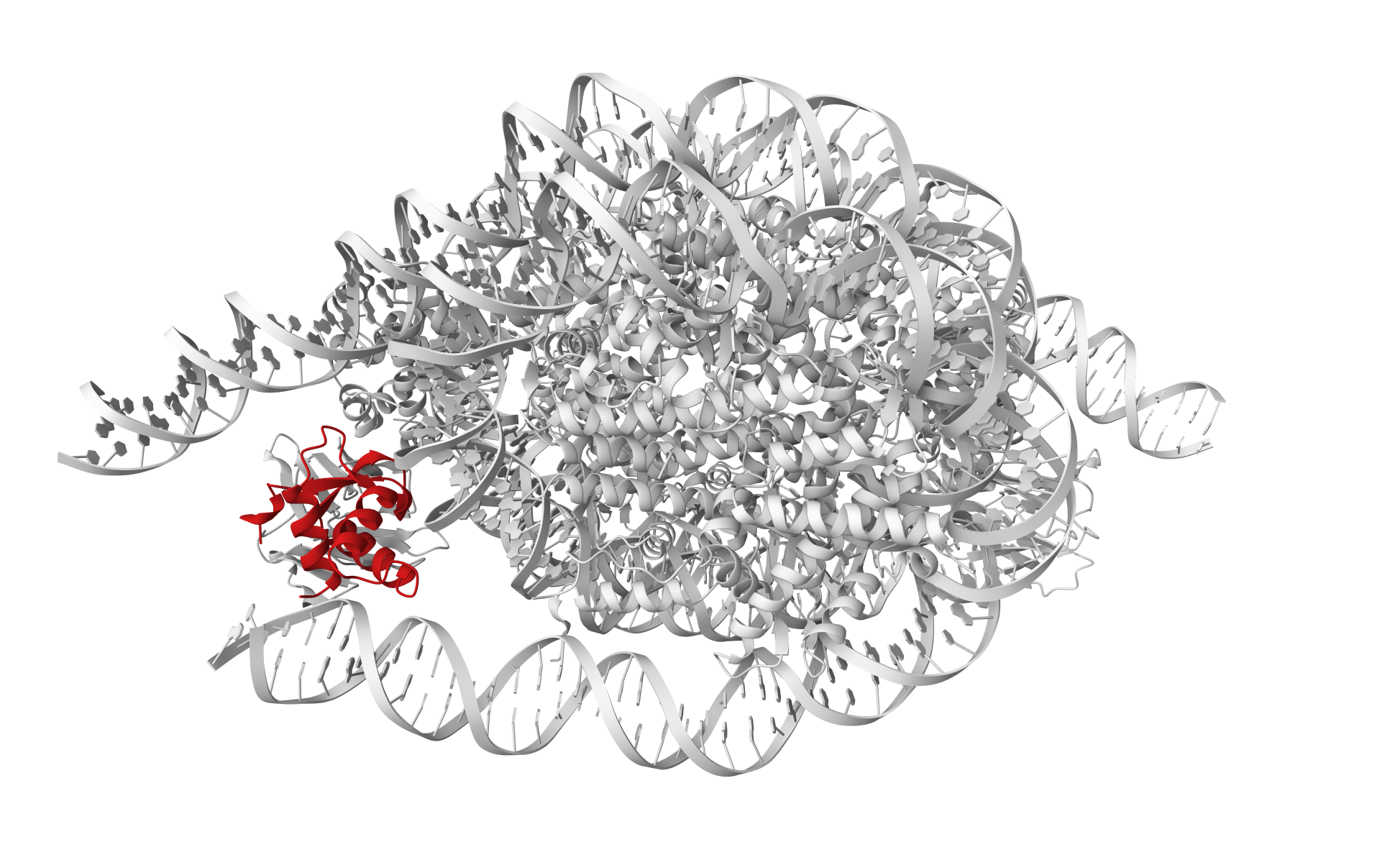

Identifiers
- Aliases: H1-1, H1.1, H1A, H1F1, HIST1, histone cluster 1, H1a, histone cluster 1 H1 family member a, H1.1 linker histone, cluster member, HIST1H1A
- External IDs: OMIM: 142709; MGI: 1931523; GeneCards: H1-1

Gene location (Human)
| Chr. | Chromosome 6 (human) |
| Band | 6p22.2 | Start | 26,017,032 bp |
| Band | 6p22.2 | End | 26,017,787 bp |

Gene location (Mouse)
| Chr. | Chromosome 13 (mouse) |
| Band | 13|13 A3.1 | Start | 23,947,649 bp |
| Band | 13|13 A3.1 | End | 23,948,389 bp |
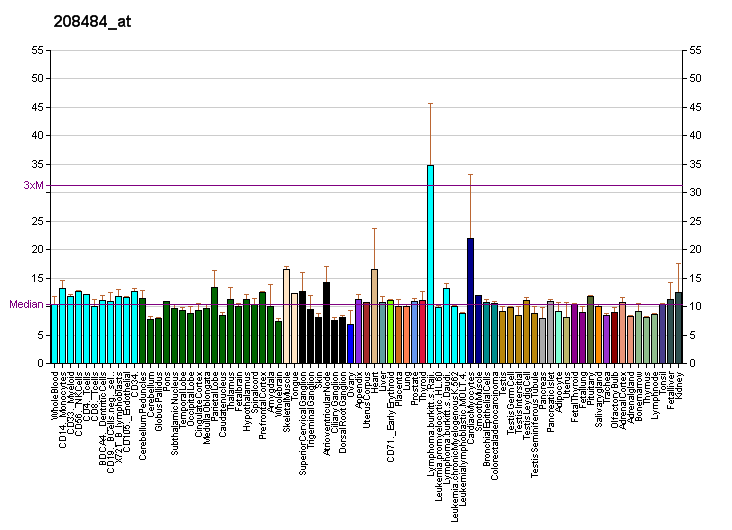
RNA expression pattern
| Bgee | Human / Mouse (ortholog); Top expressed in: oocyte; secondary oocyte; buccal mucosa cell; testicle; tendon of biceps brachii; Achilles tendon; tonsil; ventricular zone; liver; embryo / Top expressed in: spermatid; uterus; spermatocyte; embryonic cell; secondary oocyte; primary oocyte; zygote; blastocyst; genital tubercle; morula; More reference expression data |
| BioGPS | More reference expression data |
Gene ontology
| Molecular function | DNA binding; chromatin DNA binding; protein binding; heparin binding; double-stranded DNA binding; nucleosomal DNA binding |
| Cellular component | nucleosome; nucleus; chromosome; cell surface; vesicle |
| Biological process | nucleosome assembly; spermatogenesis; positive regulation of receptor-mediated endocytosis; regulation of transcription, DNA-templated; chromosome condensation; negative regulation of DNA recombination |
Sources:Amigo / QuickGO
Orthologs
| Databases | NCBI: entry; OMA: entry |
| Species | Human | Mouse |
| Entrez | 3024 | 80838 |
| Ensembl | ENSG00000124610 | ENSMUSG00000049539 |
| UniProt | Q02539 | P43275 |
| RefSeq (mRNA) | NM_005325 | NM_030609 |
| RefSeq (protein) | NP_005316 | NP_085112 |
| Location (UCSC) | Chr 6: 26.02 – 26.02 Mb | Chr 13: 23.95 – 23.95 Mb |
| PubMed search |
- Wikidata
| View/Edit Human | View/Edit Mouse |

Histone H1.1 is a protein that in humans is encoded by the HIST1H1A gene.

Histones are basic nuclear proteins responsible for nucleosome structure of the chromosomal fiber in eukaryotes. Two molecules of each of the four core histones (H2A, H2B, H3, and H4) form an octamer, around which approximately 146 bp of DNA is wrapped in repeating units, called nucleosomes. The linker histone, H1, interacts with linker DNA between nucleosomes and functions in the compaction of chromatin into higher order structures. This gene is intronless and encodes a member of the histone H1 family. Transcripts from this gene lack polyA tails but instead contain a palindromic termination element. This gene is found in the large histone gene cluster on chromosome 6.
