= HIST1H2AI =

Protein-coding gene in the species Homo sapiens

H2AC13

Identifiers
- Aliases: H2AC13, H2A/c, H2AFC, histone cluster 1, H2ai, histone cluster 1 H2A family member i, H2A clustered histone 13, HIST1H2AI, H2AC11, H2AC15, H2AC17, H2AC16
- External IDs: OMIM: 602787; GeneCards: H2AC13
Available structures
PDB	Human UniProt search: PDBe RCSB
PDB	List of PDB id codes 4QYL, 5KGF

Gene location (Human)
Chr.	Chromosome 6 (human)
Band	6p22.1	Start	27,808,173 bp
Band	6p22.1	End	27,808,667 bp
RNA expression pattern
Bgee	Human / Mouse (ortholog); Top expressed in: bone marrow cell; gonad; monocyte; epithelium of colon; blood; mucosa of transverse colon; tonsil; rectum; thymus; ventricular zone / n/a; More reference expression data
BioGPS	n/a
Gene ontology
Molecular function	enzyme binding; DNA binding; protein binding; protein heterodimerization activity
Cellular component	nucleosome; extracellular exosome; nucleus; chromosome
Biological process	chromatin organization; biological process
Sources:Amigo / QuickGO
Orthologs
Databases	NCBI: entry; OMA: entry
Species	Human	Mouse
Entrez	8329	n/a
Ensembl	ENSG00000196747	n/a
UniProt	P0C0S8	n/a
RefSeq (mRNA)	NM_003509	n/a
RefSeq (protein)	NP_066408; NP_003505	n/a
Location (UCSC)	Chr 6: 27.81 – 27.81 Mb	n/a
PubMed search		n/a
- Wikidata
View/Edit Human

Histone H2A type 1 is a protein that in humans is encoded by the HIST1H2AI gene.

Histones are basic nuclear proteins that are responsible for the nucleosome structure of the chromosomal fiber in eukaryotes. Two molecules of each of the four core histones (H2A, H2B, H3, and H4) form an octamer, around which approximately 146 bp of DNA is wrapped in repeating units, called nucleosomes. The linker histone, H1, interacts with linker DNA between nucleosomes and functions in the compaction of chromatin into higher order structures. This gene is intronless and encodes a member of the histone H2A family. Transcripts from this gene lack polyA tails but instead contain a palindromic termination element. This gene is found in the small histone gene cluster on chromosome 6p22-p21.3.
