= HIST1H1D =

Protein-coding gene in the species Homo sapiens

H1-3
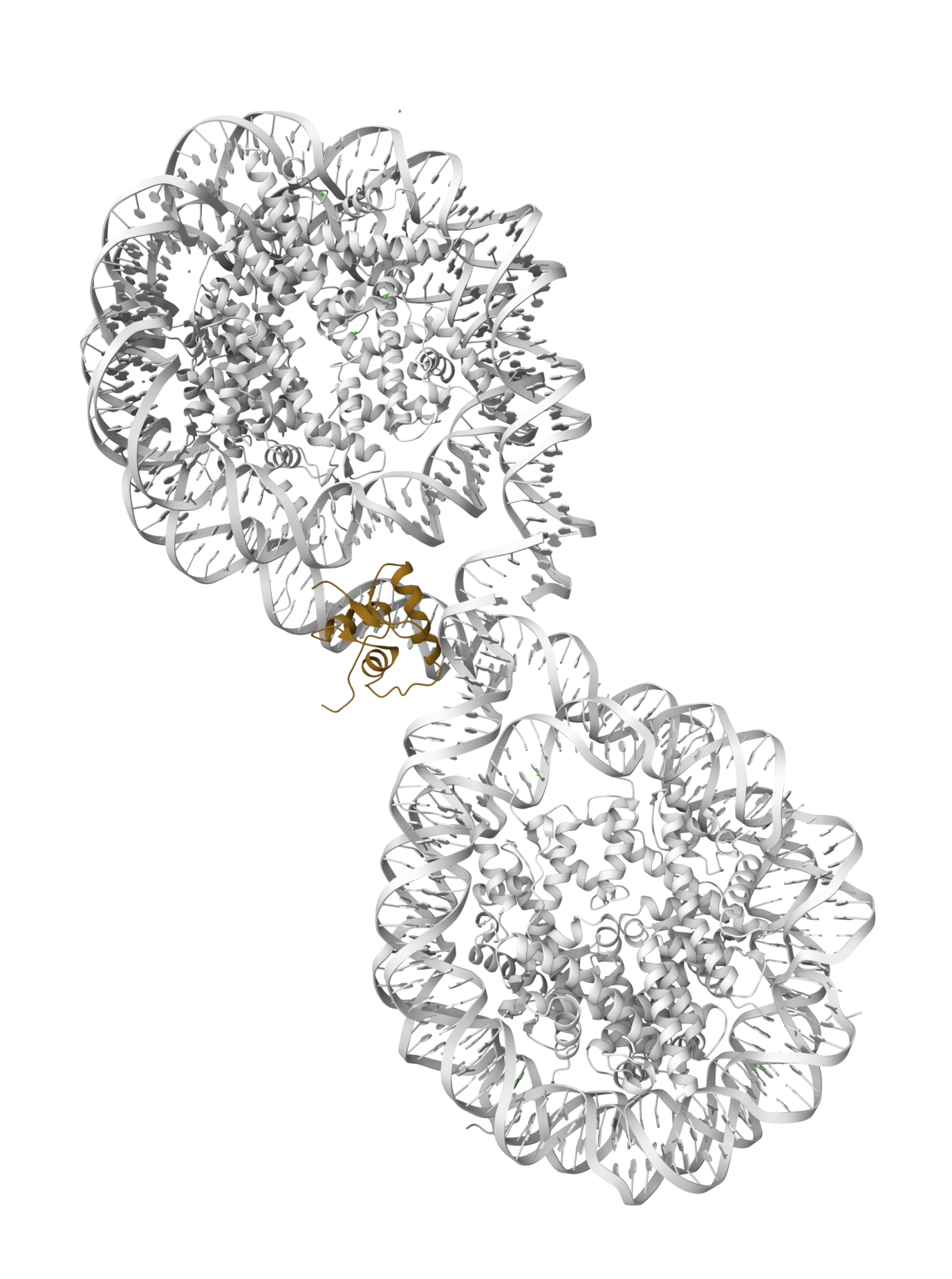

Identifiers
- Aliases: H1-3, H1.3, H1D, H1F3, H1s-2, histone cluster 1, H1d, histone cluster 1 H1 family member d, H1.3 linker histone, cluster member, HIST1H1D
- External IDs: OMIM: 142210; MGI: 107502; GeneCards: H1-3

Gene location (Human)
| Chr. | Chromosome 6 (human) |
| Band | 6p22.2 | Start | 26,234,212 bp |
| Band | 6p22.2 | End | 26,234,987 bp |

Gene location (Mouse)
| Chr. | Chromosome 13 (mouse) |
| Band | 13|13 A3.1 | Start | 23,737,436 bp |
| Band | 13|13 A3.1 | End | 23,744,860 bp |
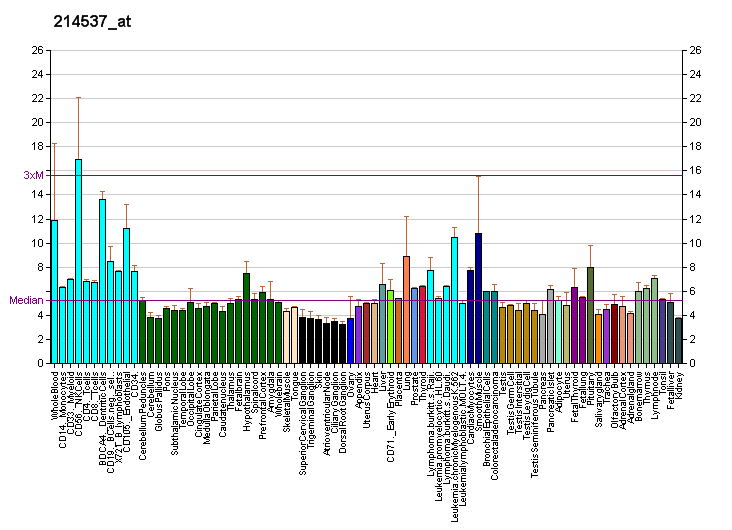
RNA expression pattern
| Bgee | Human / Mouse (ortholog); Top expressed in: Achilles tendon; gonad; epithelium of colon; bone marrow cell; testicle; ventricular zone; tonsil; embryo; sural nerve; ganglionic eminence / Top expressed in: gray matter layer of cerebellum; seminiferous tubule; hair follicle; mandibular prominence; primitive streak; abdominal wall; ascending aorta; aortic valve; fossa; endothelial cell of lymphatic vessel; More reference expression data |
| BioGPS | More reference expression data |
Gene ontology
| Molecular function | DNA binding; chromatin DNA binding; RNA binding; double-stranded DNA binding; protein binding; nucleosomal DNA binding |
| Cellular component | nucleosome; nucleus; chromosome |
| Biological process | regulation of transcription by RNA polymerase II; histone H3-K4 trimethylation; nucleosome assembly; negative regulation of transcription by RNA polymerase II; histone H3-K27 trimethylation; regulation of transcription, DNA-templated; chromosome condensation; negative regulation of DNA recombination |
Sources:Amigo / QuickGO
Orthologs
| Databases | NCBI: entry; OMA: entry |
| Species | Human | Mouse |
| Entrez | 3007 | 14957 |
| Ensembl | ENSG00000124575 | ENSMUSG00000052565 |
| UniProt | P16402 | P43277 |
| RefSeq (mRNA) | NM_005320 | NM_145713 |
| RefSeq (protein) | NP_005311 | NP_663759 |
| Location (UCSC) | Chr 6: 26.23 – 26.23 Mb | Chr 13: 23.74 – 23.74 Mb |
| PubMed search |
- Wikidata
| View/Edit Human | View/Edit Mouse |

Histone H1.3 is a protein encoded by the HIST1H1D gene in humans.

Histones are basic nuclear proteins that play a crucial role in the nucleosome structure of chromosomal fibers in eukaryotes. Two molecules each of the four core histones (H2A, H2B, H3, and H4) form an octamer, around which approximately 146 bp of DNA is wrapped to create repeating units called nucleosomes. The linker histone, H1, interacts with linker DNA between nucleosomes and facilitates the compaction of chromatin into higher-order structures. This intronless gene encodes a member of the histone H1 family. Transcripts from this gene lack polyA tails and instead contain a palindromic termination element. This gene is located within the large histone gene cluster on chromosome 6.
