= HIST2H2BF =

Protein-coding gene in humans

H2BC18

Identifiers
- Aliases: H2BC18, histone cluster 2 H2B family member f, H2B clustered histone 18, HIST2H2BF
- External IDs: MGI: 2448413; GeneCards: H2BC18

Gene location (Human)
Chr.	Chromosome 1 (human)
Band	1q21.2	Start	149,782,689 bp
Band	1q21.2	End	149,812,373 bp

Gene location (Mouse)
Chr.	Chromosome 3 (mouse)
Band	3|3 F2.1	Start	96,177,068 bp
Band	3|3 F2.1	End	96,177,448 bp
RNA expression pattern
Bgee	Human / Mouse (ortholog); Top expressed in: bone marrow cell; testicle; blood; epithelium of colon; corpus callosum; right uterine tube; left ovary; prostate; right hemisphere of cerebellum; right ovary / Top expressed in: uterus; bone marrow; tail of embryo; genital tubercle; embryo; embryo; morula; yolk sac; zygote; mesencephalon; More reference expression data
BioGPS	n/a
Gene ontology
Molecular function	protein heterodimerization activity; DNA binding; molecular function
Cellular component	chromosome; nucleosome; extracellular exosome; nucleus; nucleoplasm; cytosol
Biological process	nucleosome assembly
Sources:Amigo / QuickGO
Orthologs
Databases	NCBI: entry; OMA: entry
Species	Human	Mouse
Entrez	440689	319189
Ensembl	ENSG00000203814	ENSMUSG00000105827
UniProt	Q5QNW6	Q64525
RefSeq (mRNA)	NM_001024599; NM_001161334	NM_175666
RefSeq (protein)	NP_001019770; NP_001154806	NP_783597
Location (UCSC)	Chr 1: 149.78 – 149.81 Mb	Chr 3: 96.18 – 96.18 Mb
PubMed search
- Wikidata
View/Edit Human	View/Edit Mouse

Histone H2B type 2-F is a protein that in humans is encoded by the HIST2H2BF gene.
