= HIST3H3 =

Protein-coding gene in humans

H3-4

Identifiers
- Aliases: H3-4, H3.4, H3/g, H3FT, H3t, histone cluster 3, H3, histone cluster 3 H3, HIST3H3, H3.4 histone
- External IDs: OMIM: 602820; GeneCards: H3-4
Available structures
PDB	Human UniProt search: PDBe RCSB
PDB	List of PDB id codes 2V1D, 2YBP, 2YBS, 3A6N, 3T6R, 4V2W

Gene location (Human)
Chr.	Chromosome 1 (human)
Band	1q42.13	Start	228,424,845 bp
Band	1q42.13	End	228,425,360 bp
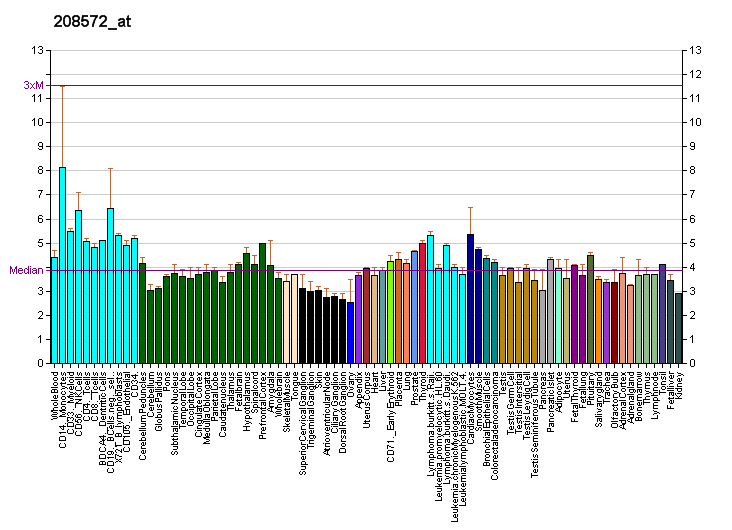
RNA expression pattern
Bgee	Human / Mouse (ortholog); Top expressed in: testicle; right testis; left testis; right coronary artery; granulocyte; ectocervix; canal of the cervix; mucosa of transverse colon; right uterine tube; right ovary / n/a; More reference expression data
BioGPS	More reference expression data
Gene ontology
Molecular function	protein heterodimerization activity; DNA binding; histone binding; protein binding; nucleosomal DNA binding
Cellular component	nucleosome; extracellular exosome; nucleus; chromosome; nucleoplasm
Biological process	negative regulation of protein oligomerization; nucleosome assembly; protein heterotetramerization; double-strand break repair via nonhomologous end joining; telomere capping
Sources:Amigo / QuickGO
Orthologs
Databases	NCBI: entry; OMA: entry
Species	Human	Mouse
Entrez	8290	n/a
Ensembl	ENSG00000168148; ENSG00000285435	n/a
UniProt	Q16695	n/a
RefSeq (mRNA)	NM_003493	n/a
RefSeq (protein)	NP_003484	n/a
Location (UCSC)	Chr 1: 228.42 – 228.43 Mb	n/a
PubMed search		n/a
- Wikidata
View/Edit Human

Histone H3.1t is a protein that in humans is encoded by the HIST3H3 gene.

Histones are basic nuclear proteins that are responsible for the nucleosome structure of the chromosomal fiber in eukaryotes. Nucleosomes consist of approximately 146 bp of DNA wrapped around a histone octamer composed of pairs of each of the four core histones (H2A, H2B, H3, and H4). The chromatin fiber is further compacted through the interaction of a linker histone, H1, with the DNA between the nucleosomes to form higher order chromatin structures. This gene is intronless and encodes a member of the histone H3 family. Transcripts from this gene lack polyA tails; instead, they contain a palindromic termination element. This gene is located separately from the other H3 genes that are in the histone gene cluster on chromosome 6p22-p21.3.
