= HIST1H2BI =

Protein-coding gene in the species Homo sapiens

H2BC10

Identifiers
- Aliases: H2BC10, H2B/k, H2BFK, histone cluster 1, H2bi, histone cluster 1 H2B family member i, H2B clustered histone 10, HIST1H2BI, H2BC8, H2BC7, H2BC6, H2BC4
- External IDs: OMIM: 602807; MGI: 1915274; GeneCards: H2BC10
Available structures
PDB	Ortholog search: PDBe RCSB
PDB	List of PDB id codes 5KGF

Gene location (Human)
Chr.	Chromosome 6 (human)
Band	6p22.2	Start	26,272,931 bp
Band	6p22.2	End	26,273,412 bp

Gene location (Mouse)
Chr.	Chromosome 13 (mouse)
Band	13|13 A3.1	Start	23,868,182 bp
Band	13|13 A3.1	End	23,876,891 bp
RNA expression pattern
Bgee	Human / Mouse (ortholog); Top expressed in: bone marrow cell; Achilles tendon; epithelium of colon; thymus; jejunal mucosa; tonsil; oral cavity; pylorus; cartilage tissue; epithelium of bronchus / Top expressed in: blood; left colon; left lobe of liver; seminal vesicula; decidua; epithelium of stomach; Epithelium of choroid plexus; intercostal muscle; calvaria; right lung lobe; More reference expression data
BioGPS	n/a
Gene ontology
Molecular function	DNA binding; protein binding; protein heterodimerization activity; identical protein binding
Cellular component	chromosome; nucleosome; extracellular exosome; nucleus; nucleoplasm; extracellular space; cytosol
Biological process	nucleosome assembly; innate immune response in mucosa; defense response to bacterium; protein ubiquitination; antimicrobial humoral immune response mediated by antimicrobial peptide
Sources:Amigo / QuickGO
Orthologs
Databases	NCBI: entry; OMA: entry
Species	Human	Mouse
Entrez	8346	68024
Ensembl	ENSG00000278588	ENSMUSG00000018102
UniProt	P62807	Q6ZWY9
RefSeq (mRNA)	NM_003525	NM_001290380; NM_023422
RefSeq (protein)	NP_003517; NP_001368918	NP_001171124; NP_001277459; NP_835501; NP_835503; NP_001277309 NP_075911
Location (UCSC)	Chr 6: 26.27 – 26.27 Mb	Chr 13: 23.87 – 23.88 Mb
PubMed search
- Wikidata
View/Edit Human	View/Edit Mouse

Histone H2B type 1-C/E/F/G/I is a protein that in humans is encoded by the HIST1H2BI gene.

Histones are basic nuclear proteins that are responsible for the nucleosome structure of the chromosomal fiber in eukaryotes. Two molecules of each of the four core histones (H2A, H2B, H3, and H4) form an octamer, around which approximately 146 bp of DNA is wrapped in repeating units, called nucleosomes. The linker histone, H1, interacts with linker DNA between nucleosomes and functions in the compaction of chromatin into higher order structures. This gene is intronless and encodes a member of the histone H2B family. Transcripts from this gene lack polyA tails but instead contain a palindromic termination element. This gene is found in the large histone gene cluster on chromosome 6.
