= HIST1H1T =

Protein-coding gene in the species Homo sapiens

H1-6

Identifiers
- Aliases: H1-6, H1FT, H1t, dJ221C16.2, H1.6, histone cluster 1, H1t, histone cluster 1 H1 family member t, HIST1H1T, H1.6 linker histone, cluster member
- External IDs: OMIM: 142712; MGI: 1888530; GeneCards: H1-6

Gene location (Human)
Chr.	Chromosome 6 (human)
Band	6p22.2	Start	26,107,412 bp
Band	6p22.2	End	26,108,135 bp

Gene location (Mouse)
Chr.	Chromosome 13 (mouse)
Band	13|13 A3.1	Start	23,879,797 bp
Band	13|13 A3.1	End	23,880,708 bp
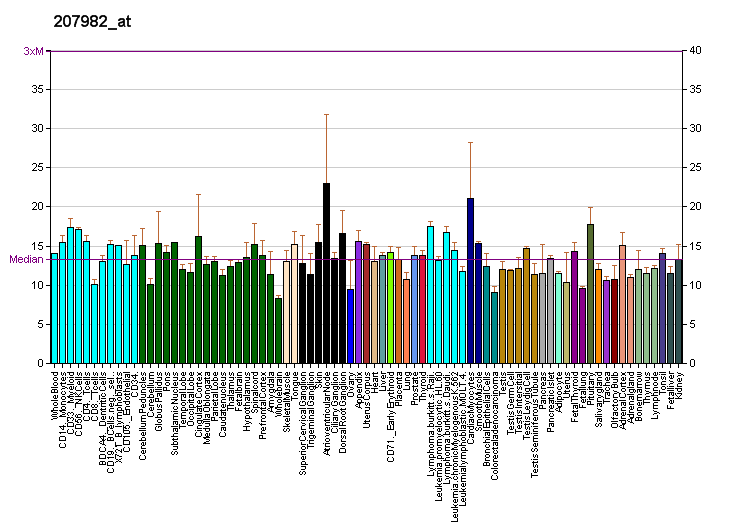
RNA expression pattern
Bgee	Human / Mouse (ortholog); Top expressed in: testicle; gonad; monocyte; corpus callosum; blood; left testis; right testis; islet of Langerhans; right lung; human musculoskeletal system / Top expressed in: spermatocyte; spermatid; embryo; embryo; pharynx; lesser wing of sphenoid bone; gray matter layer of cerebellum; perirhinal cortex; entorhinal cortex; choroid plexus of fourth ventricle; More reference expression data
BioGPS	More reference expression data
Gene ontology
Molecular function	DNA binding; double-stranded DNA binding; protein binding; nucleosomal DNA binding
Cellular component	nucleosome; nucleus; chromosome; condensed nuclear chromosome
Biological process	multicellular organism development; nucleosome assembly; cell differentiation; spermatogenesis; regulation of transcription, DNA-templated; binding of sperm to zona pellucida; chromosome condensation; flagellated sperm motility; negative regulation of DNA recombination
Sources:Amigo / QuickGO
Orthologs
Databases	NCBI: entry; OMA: entry
Species	Human	Mouse
Entrez	3010	107970
Ensembl	ENSG00000187475	ENSMUSG00000036211
UniProt	P22492	Q07133
RefSeq (mRNA)	NM_005323	NM_010377
RefSeq (protein)	NP_005314	NP_034507
Location (UCSC)	Chr 6: 26.11 – 26.11 Mb	Chr 13: 23.88 – 23.88 Mb
PubMed search
- Wikidata
View/Edit Human	View/Edit Mouse

Histone H1t is a protein that in humans is encoded by the HIST1H1T gene.

Histones are basic nuclear proteins responsible for nucleosome structure of the chromosomal fiber in eukaryotes. Two molecules of each of the four core histones (H2A, H2B, H3, and H4) form an octamer, around which approximately 146 bp of DNA is wrapped in repeating units, called nucleosomes. The linker histone, H1, interacts with linker DNA between nucleosomes and functions in the compaction of chromatin into higher order structures. This gene is intronless and encodes a member of the histone H1 family. Transcripts from this gene lack polyA tails but instead contain a palindromic termination element. This gene is found in the large histone gene cluster on chromosome 6.
