= HIST1H2BA =

Protein-coding gene in the species Homo sapiens

H2BC1

Identifiers
- Aliases: H2BC1, H2BFU, STBP, TSH2B, TSH2B.1, bA317E16.3, TH2B, histone cluster 1, H2ba, histone cluster 1 H2B family member a, hTSH2B, HIST1H2BA, H2B clustered histone 1
- External IDs: OMIM: 609904; MGI: 2448375; GeneCards: H2BC1
Available structures
PDB	Ortholog search: PDBe RCSB
PDB	List of PDB id codes 3WKJ

Gene location (Human)
Chr.	Chromosome 6 (human)
Band	6p22.2	Start	25,726,777 bp
Band	6p22.2	End	25,727,345 bp

Gene location (Mouse)
Chr.	Chromosome 13 (mouse)
Band	13|13 A3.1	Start	24,117,756 bp
Band	13|13 A3.1	End	24,118,139 bp
RNA expression pattern
Bgee	Human / Mouse (ortholog); Top expressed in: gonad; testicle; left testis; right testis; sperm; kidney; human kidney; right lobe of liver; metanephros; respiratory system / Top expressed in: spermatocyte; spermatid; secondary oocyte; primary oocyte; zygote; embryo; embryo; testicle; genital tubercle; tail of embryo; More reference expression data
BioGPS	n/a
Gene ontology
Molecular function	protein heterodimerization activity; DNA binding; histone binding; molecular function
Cellular component	nucleosome; extrinsic component of plasma membrane; nucleus; chromosome; nucleoplasm; DNA packaging complex
Biological process	mononuclear cell migration; nucleosome assembly; positive regulation of binding; nucleosome disassembly; plasminogen activation; inflammatory response; chromatin organization; protein ubiquitination
Sources:Amigo / QuickGO
Orthologs
Databases	NCBI: entry; OMA: entry
Species	Human	Mouse
Entrez	255626	319177
Ensembl	ENSG00000146047	ENSMUSG00000050799
UniProt	Q96A08	P70696
RefSeq (mRNA)	NM_170610	NM_175663
RefSeq (protein)	NP_733759	NP_783594
Location (UCSC)	Chr 6: 25.73 – 25.73 Mb	Chr 13: 24.12 – 24.12 Mb
PubMed search
- Wikidata
View/Edit Human	View/Edit Mouse

Histone H2B type 1-A is a protein that in humans is encoded by the HIST1H2BA gene.

Histones are basic nuclear proteins that are responsible for the nucleosome structure of the chromosomal fiber in eukaryotes. Nucleosomes consist of approximately 146 bp of DNA wrapped around a histone octamer composed of pairs of each of the four core histones (H2A, H2B, H3, and H4). The chromatin fiber is further compacted through the interaction of a linker histone, H1, with the DNA between the nucleosomes to form higher order chromatin structures. This gene is intronless and encodes a testis/sperm-specific member of the histone H2B family. Transcripts from this gene contain a palindromic termination element.
