= HIST1H2AA =

Protein-coding gene in the species Homo sapiens

H2AC1

Identifiers
- Aliases: H2AC1, H2AA, H2AFR, bA317E16.2, TH2A, histone cluster 1, H2aa, histone cluster 1 H2A family member a, HIST1H2AA, H2A clustered histone 1, HISTH2AA
- External IDs: OMIM: 613499; MGI: 2448297; GeneCards: H2AC1

Gene location (Human)
Chr.	Chromosome 6 (human)
Band	6p22.2	Start	25,726,063 bp
Band	6p22.2	End	25,726,562 bp

Gene location (Mouse)
Chr.	Chromosome 13 (mouse)
Band	13|13 A3.1	Start	21,937,605 bp
Band	13|13 A3.1	End	21,937,997 bp
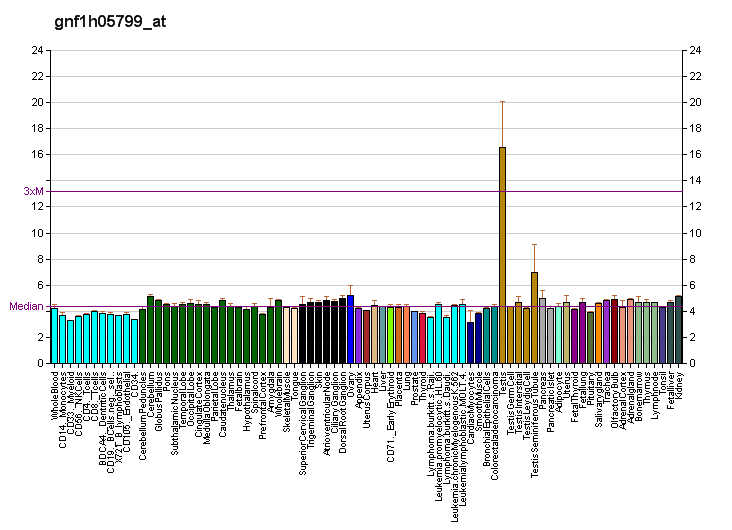
RNA expression pattern
Bgee	Human / Mouse (ortholog); Top expressed in: testicle; gonad; left testis; right testis; liver; right lobe of liver; human kidney; body of pancreas; renal cortex; respiratory system / Top expressed in: uterus; genital tubercle; spermatid; mesencephalon; tail of embryo; embryo; embryo; bone marrow; yolk sac; thymus; More reference expression data
BioGPS	More reference expression data
Gene ontology
Molecular function	protein heterodimerization activity; DNA binding
Cellular component	nucleosome; nucleus; chromosome; extracellular exosome
Biological process	chromatin organization
Sources:Amigo / QuickGO
Orthologs
Databases	NCBI: entry; OMA: entry
Species	Human	Mouse
Entrez	221613	319169
Ensembl	ENSG00000164508	ENSMUSG00000063021
UniProt	Q96QV6	Q8CGP7
RefSeq (mRNA)	NM_170745	NM_178183
RefSeq (protein)	NP_734466	NP_835490
Location (UCSC)	Chr 6: 25.73 – 25.73 Mb	Chr 13: 21.94 – 21.94 Mb
PubMed search
- Wikidata
View/Edit Human	View/Edit Mouse

Histone H2A type 1-A is a protein that in humans is encoded by the HIST1H2AA gene.

Histones are basic nuclear proteins that are responsible for the nucleosome structure of the chromosomal fiber in eukaryotes. Nucleosomes consist of approximately 146 bp of DNA wrapped around a histone octamer composed of pairs of each of the four core histones (H2A, H2B, H3, and H4). The chromatin fiber is further compacted through the interaction of a linker histone, H1, with the DNA between the nucleosomes to form higher order chromatin structures. This gene is intronless and encodes a member of the histone H2A family. Transcripts from this gene contain a palindromic termination element.
