= CCDC188 =

Protein found in humans

Identifiers
- Aliases: CCDC188, coiled-coil domain containing 188
- External IDs: HomoloGene: 90442; GeneCards: CCDC188; OMA:CCDC188 - orthologs

Gene location (Human)
Chr.	Chromosome 22 (human)
Band	22q11.21	Start	20,148,416 bp
Band	22q11.21	End	20,151,055 bp
RNA expression pattern
Bgee	Human / Mouse (ortholog); Top expressed in: left testis; right testis; pituitary gland; sural nerve; anterior pituitary; right hemisphere of cerebellum; gastric mucosa; hypothalamus; stromal cell of endometrium; right frontal lobe / n/a; More reference expression data
BioGPS	n/a
Orthologs
Species	Human	Mouse
Entrez	388849	102638083
Ensembl	ENSG00000234409	ENSMUSG00000090777
UniProt	H7C350	n/a
RefSeq (mRNA)	NM_001243537; NM_001365892	XM_006522809; XM_006522811; XM_006536810; XM_006536812; XM_006536881 XM_006536883; XM_011246064; XM_011246065; XM_011246066; XM_011246067; XM_011246068; XM_011251448; XM_011251449; XM_011251450; XM_011251451; XM_011251452; XM_011251490; XM_011251491; XM_011251492; XM_011251493; XM_011251494; XM_017317178; XM_017317179; XM_017318928; XM_017318929; XM_017318943; XM_017318944
RefSeq (protein)	NP_001230466; NP_001352821	n/a
Location (UCSC)	Chr 22: 20.15 – 20.15 Mb	n/a
PubMed search
- Wikidata
View/Edit Human	View/Edit Mouse

CCDC188 or coiled-coil domain containing protein is a protein that in humans is encoded by the CCDC188 gene.

== Gene ==
Human CCDC188 gene spans 3715 nucleotides and is located on the minus strand of chromosome 22 at 22q11.21. It is a protein coding gene that encodes CCDC188 protein. The mRNA transcript consists of 9 different exons which are spliced to form the 6 distinct CCDC188 protein isoforms. Genetic neighbors of CCDC188 include ZDHHC8, SNORA77B, and RANBP1.

Isoform Table
Transcript Name	Accession number	Exons	Nucleotide length	Final Protein Length (aa)
CCDC188	NM_001365892.2	9	1476	402
CCDC188 Isoform X1	XM_005261238.3	7	2501	435
CCDC188 Isoform X2	XM_005261239.3	7	2445	416
CCDC188 Isoform X4	XM_011530170.2	9	2364	402
CCDC188 Isoform X5	XM_011530171.2	7	2396	400
CCDC188 Isoform X6	XM_005261241.3	7	2393	399

== RNA expression ==
CCDC188 is expressed at low levels across all adult tissues with increased expression in the pituitary gland and testis. CCDC188 has decreased expression in G1 of the cell cycle.

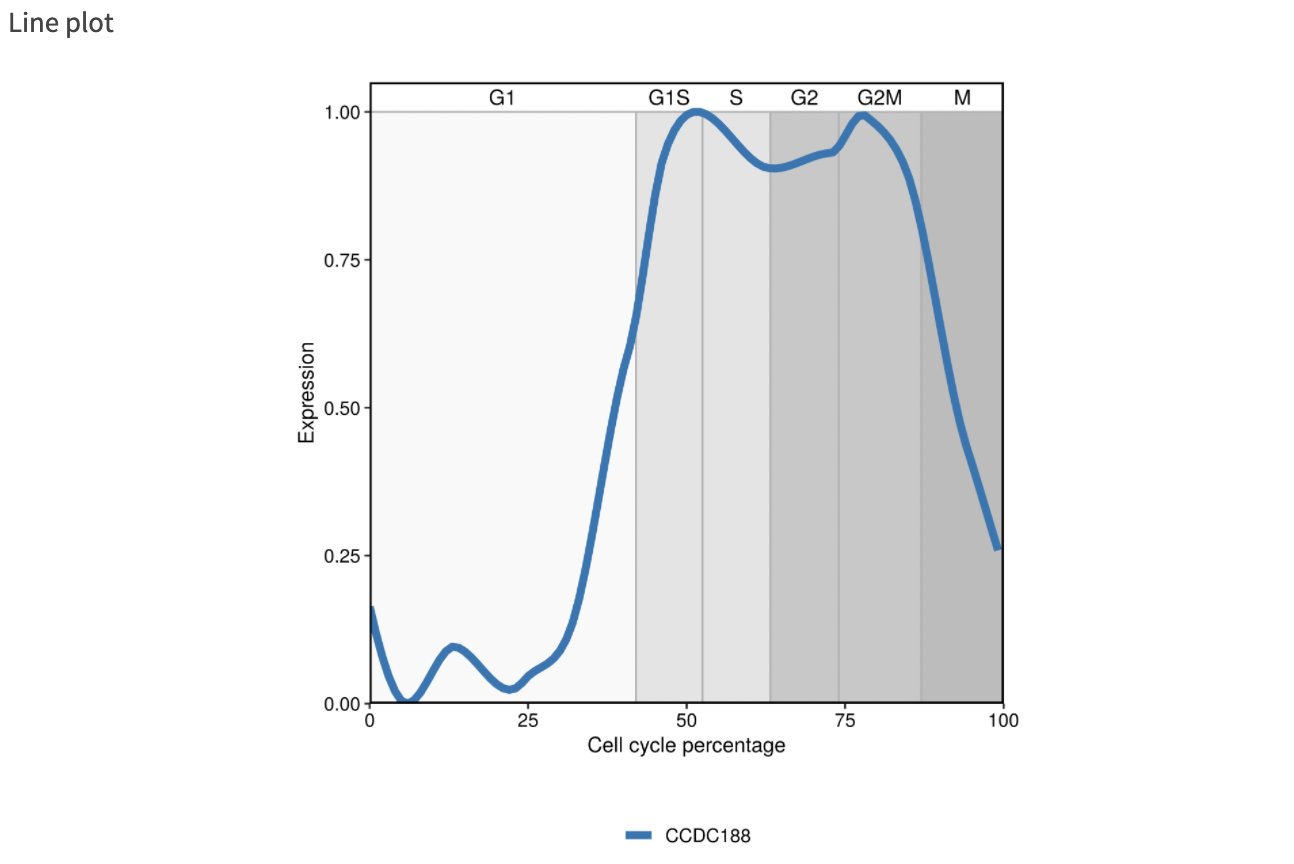
Expression in Cell Cycle

Genes with similar mRNA expression in the hypothalamus, supraoptic nucleus, and dentate gyrus are shown in the table below.

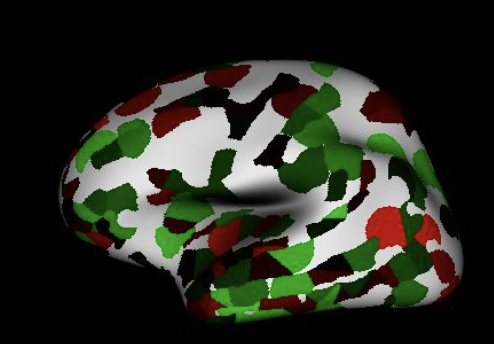
Heatmap of CCDC188 RNA Expression in Human Brain

Co-expressed Genes
Structure	Gene	Expande Name	Function	Pearson Coefficient
Hypothalamus	SKAP1	Src Kinase Associated Phosphoprotein 1	Couple T-cell antigen receptor stimulation to the activation of integrins	0.71
	CLIC1	Chloride Intracellular Channel 1	Nuclear chloride ion channel activity	0.659
	PPAPDC1B	Phospholipid Phosphatase 5	Converts diacylglycerol pyrophosphate into phosphatidate	0.656
	FAM27A	NA	lncRNA	0.653
	ZCWPW2	Zinc Finger CW-Type and PWWP Domain Containing 2	Transcription factor that binds to histone methyl groups	-0.612
	ZNF519	Zinc Finger Protein 519	Transcription Factor	-0.61
	SLC8A1	Solute Carrier Family 8 Member A1	Calcium and sodium ion exchange mediator	-0.601
Supraoptic Nucleus	ZNF181	Zinc Finger Protein 181	Transcription Factor	0.996
	DYNC1LI1	Dynein Cytoplasmic 1 Light Intermediate Chain	Intracellular trafficking and chromosome segregation during mitosis	0.991
	COX18	Cytochrome C Oxidase Assembly Factor 18	Integral membrane insertion into inner mitochondrial membrane	0.991
	LAMA2	Laminin Subunit Alpha 2	Attachment to basement membrane	0.991
	KCTD8	Potassium Channel Tetramerization Domain Containing 8	Determines kinetics of GABA-B receptor	-0.985
	KLHL2	Kelch Like Family Member 2	Mediates ubiquitination of target proteins	-0.985
Dentate Gyrus	CXCL9	CXC Motif Chemokine Ligand 9	Antimicrobial protein	0.879
	KYNU	Kynureninase	Biosynthesis of NAD cofactors from tryptophan	0.866
	MASP1	Mannose-Binding Lectin Associated Serine Protease 1	Serine protease essential for adaptive immune response	0.808
	TRPC6	Transient Receptor Potential Cation Channel	Receptor activated calcium channel	0.805

The promoter region for CCDC188 contains highly conserved p53 and CREB-ATF4 binding sites. Chromatin-immunoprecipitation analysis confirms p53 binding to the promoter region of CCDC188. Significantly repressed CCDC188 mRNA expression is found in both testicular germ line tumors and lung squamous cell cancer.

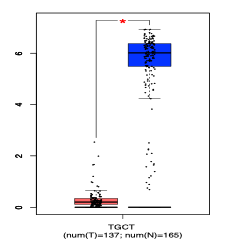
TGCT

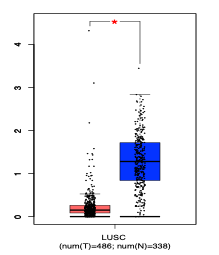
LUSC

RNA-sequencing of CCDC188 in LUSC and TGCT (red) versus healthy samples (blue)

Copy number variations of CCDC188 have also been identified in lung squamous cell tumors with 16 tumors having amplifications and 4 having homodeletions. Genes with significantly increased mRNA expression under CCDC188 amplification in lung squamous cell tumors are shown in the table below.

Upregulated Genes with CCDC188 Amplification
Gene	p-Value	q-Value	Genetic Locus
MAGED1	3.23E-06	0.013	Xp11.22
MAPK13	5.37E-06	0.0149	6p21.31
RBM4	9.36E-06	0.0202	11q13.2
NYNRIN	3.04E-05	0.0328	14q12
HDAC7	7.1E-05	0.0486	12q13.11
ZNF675	7.25E-05	0.0486	19p12

Other predicted transcription factor binding sites for CCDC188 are shown in the figure to the right.

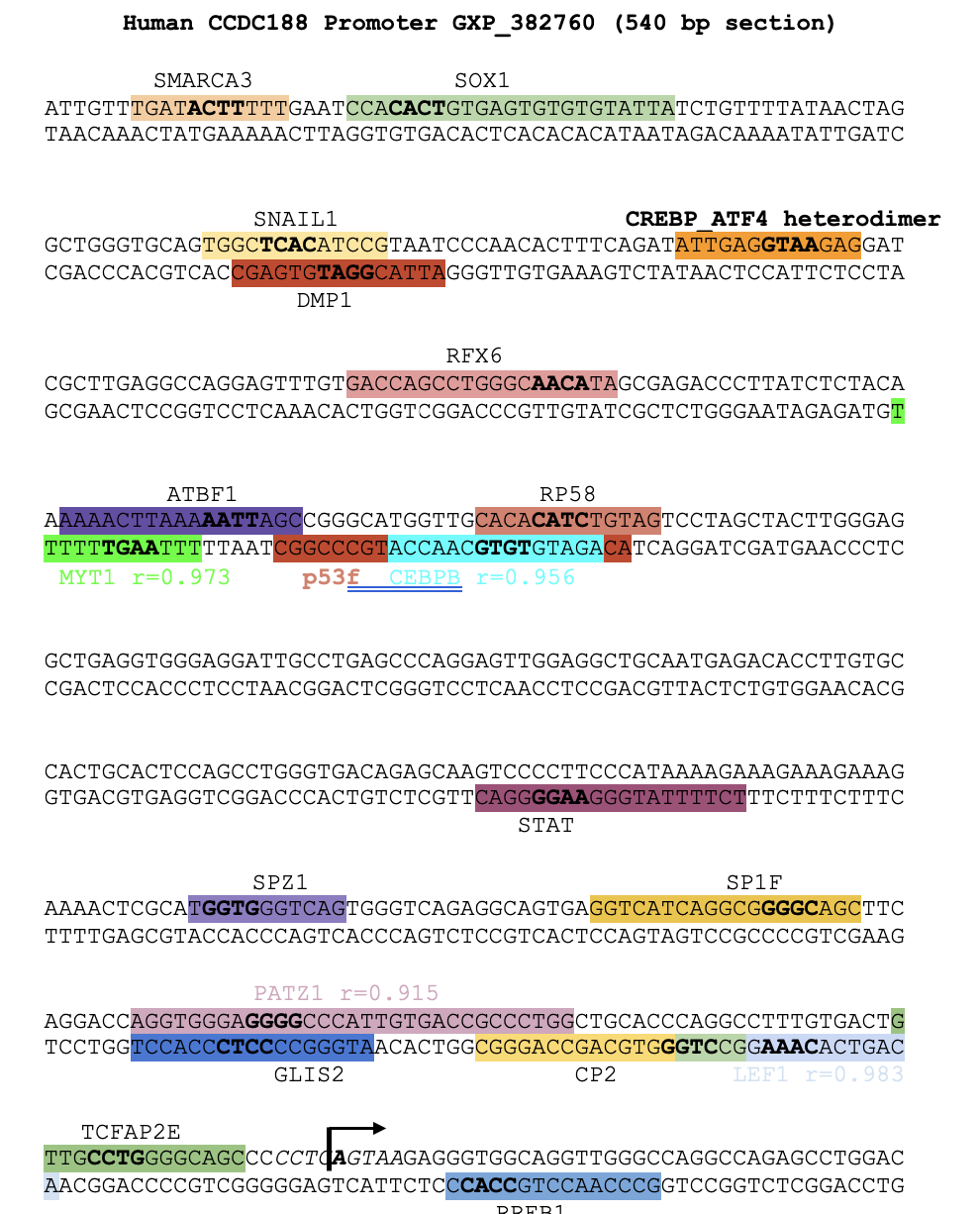
Transcription Factor Binding Sites

== Transcript regulation ==
Predicted CCDC188 3'UTR stem loops are shown in the figure below.

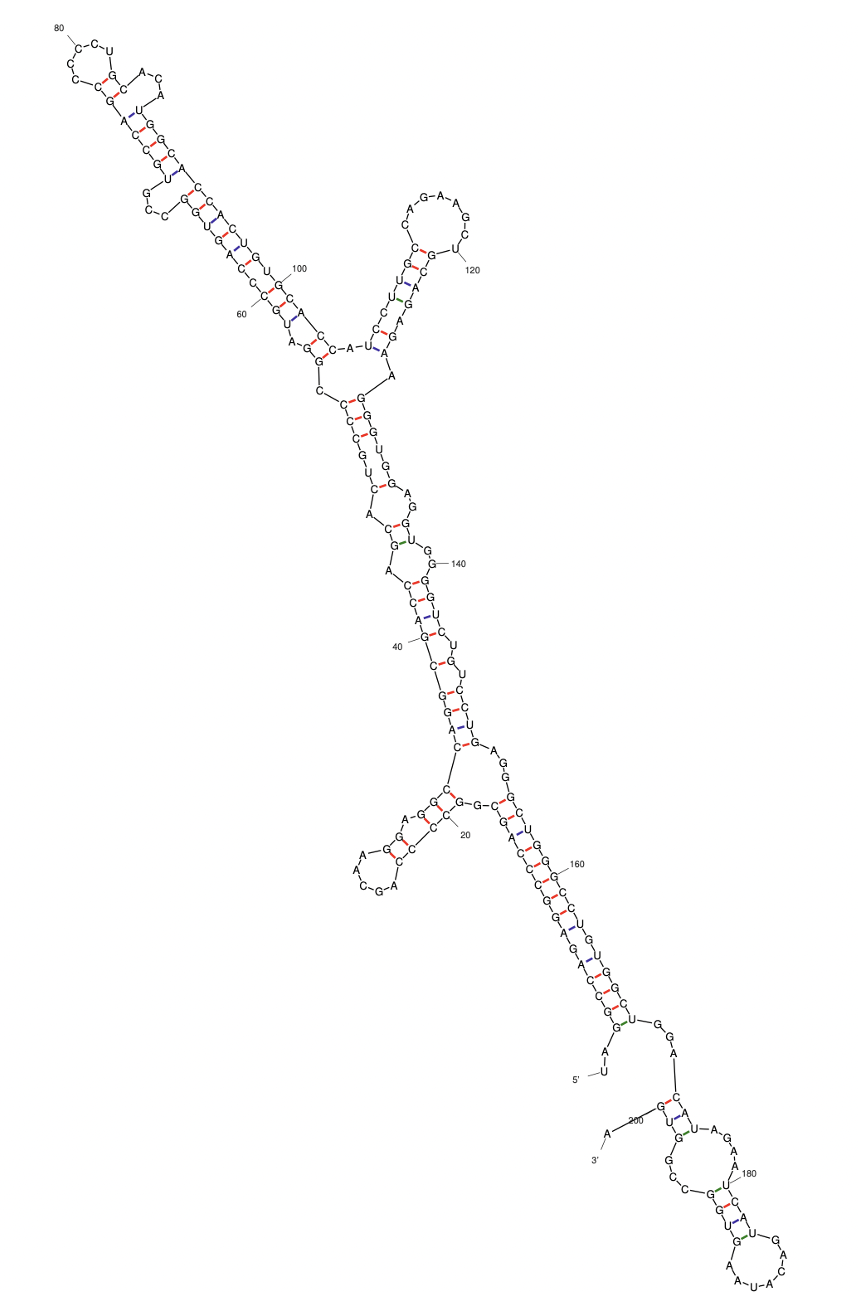
CCDC188 3'UTR

== Protein ==
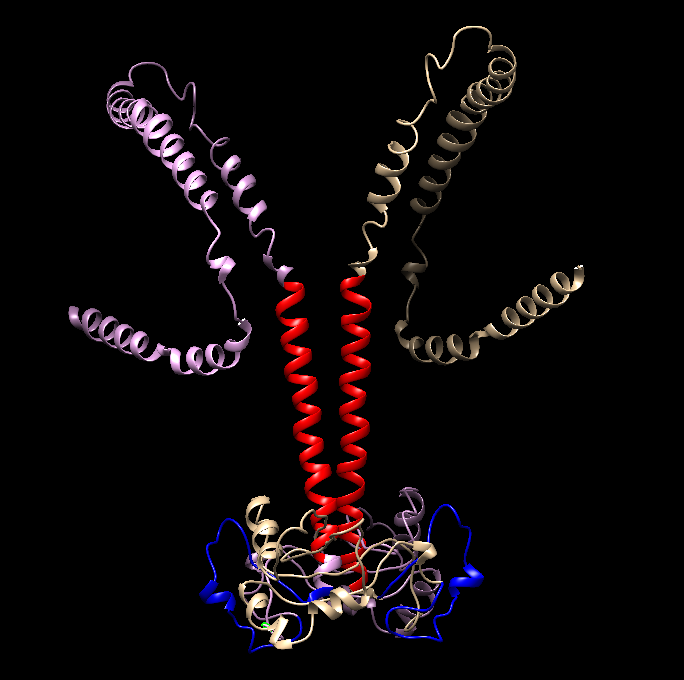
CCDC188 Homodimer Structure

CCDC188 protein is 402 amino acids long and is 4.3 kDa. The protein contains a leucine zipper and transmembrane domain. The presence of both a leucine zipper domain and transmembrane domain suggests that CCDC188 protein functions as a transcription factor that is tightly regulated and must be cleaved out of a membrane to be activated. The inactive form of the protein is predicted to be located in the endoplasmic reticulum with the N-terminus and basic leucine zipper oriented in the cytosol. Other membrane bound basic leucine zippers include ATF6 and OASIS. Known nuclear transportation routes for membrane bound transcription factors in the endoplasmic reticulum include ubiquitination and destruction of the ER lumen region and COPII vesicular transport to the Golgi for proteolytic cleavage by resident proteases.

== Post-translational modifications ==
Two phosphate groups have been experimentally verified on serine residues 322 and 324 in B-cell leukemia.

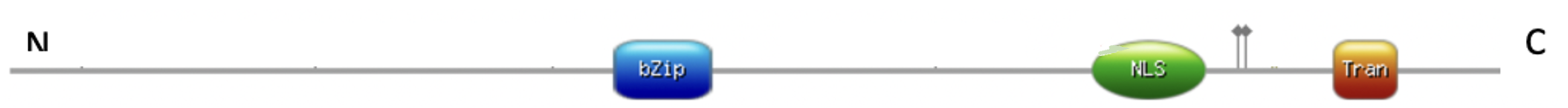

== Homology ==
CCDC188 is conserved throughout all mammals including monotremes, marsupials, and placentals

Ortholog Table
Clade	Genus & Species	Common name	Taxonomic group	Divergence Date (MYA)	Accession number	Query Cover	Sequence length (aa)	Sequence identity (%) ! !Sequence similarity (%)	
Placentals	Homo sapiens	Human	Primate	0	NP_001352821.1	100	402	100	100
	Gorilla gorilla	Western Gorilla	Primate	9	XP_004063092.3	100	402	97	98
	Rhinopithecus roxellana	Golden Snub Nosed Monkey	Primate	29	XP_010386733.2	100	393	90	91
	Marmota flaviventris	Yellow-Bellied Marmot	Rodentia	89	XP_027780043.1	100	407	76	82
	Leptonychotes weddelli	Weddell Seal	Carnivora	94	XP_030873069.1	100	407	76	82
	Ailuropoda melanoleuca	Giant Panda	Carnivora	94	XP_011225007.2	100	407	76	82
	Canis lupus	Grey Wolf	Carnivora	94	XP_025330588.1	100	407	76	82
	Talpa occidentalis	Spanish Mole	Insectivora	94	XP_037351914.1	100	406	74	79
	Globicephala melas	Long Finned Pilot Whale	Delphinidae	94	XP_030692560.1	100	408	74	80
	Molossus molossus	Velvety Free-Tailed Bat	Chiroptera	94	XP_036132060.1	100	404	74	79
	Eptesicus fuscus	Big Brown Bat	Chiroptera	94	XP_008140813.2	101	404	73	80
	Rhinolophus ferrumequinum	Greater Horshoe Bat	Chiroptera	94	XP_032953151.1	100	407	72	79
Marsupials	Phascolarctos cinereus	Koala	Phascolarctidae	160	XP_020852118.1	41	231	44	65
	Dromiciops gliroides	Colocolo Opossum	Microbiotheridae	160	XP_043845525.1	62	365	42	61
	Monodelphis domestica	Gray Short Tailed Opossum	Didelphidae	160	XP_007490407.1	62	311	41	61
	Vombatus ursinus	Common Wombat	Vombatidae	160	XP_027703176.1	62	309	40	61
	Trichosurus vulpecula	Brushtail Possum	Phalangeroidae	160	XP_036604697.1	62	289	40	59
	Sarcophilus harrisii	Tasmanian Devil	Dasyuridae	160	XP_031804879.1	65	313	38	52
Monotremes	Ornithorhynchus anatinus	Duck-Billed Platypus	Platypus	180	XP_028905014.1	40	246	35	57
	Tachyglossus aculeatus	Short-Beaked Echidna	Echidna	180	XP_038618232.1	40	383	35	55

When CCDC188 first appeared approximately 180 million years ago in monotremes, it lacked a basic leucine zipper. Marsupials were the first mammals to evolve a CCDC188 basic leucine zipper domain. The rate of evolution of CCDC188 measured by sequence identity to humans shows that CCDC188 initially evolved quickly at a rate of 0.97 changes per 100 amino acids per million years. Beginning with the first placentals, CCDC188 evolution slowed to a rate of 0.45 changes per 100 amino acids per million years. One paralog for CCDC188 exists in humans known as CCDC188-like. This gene first appeared in marsupials.

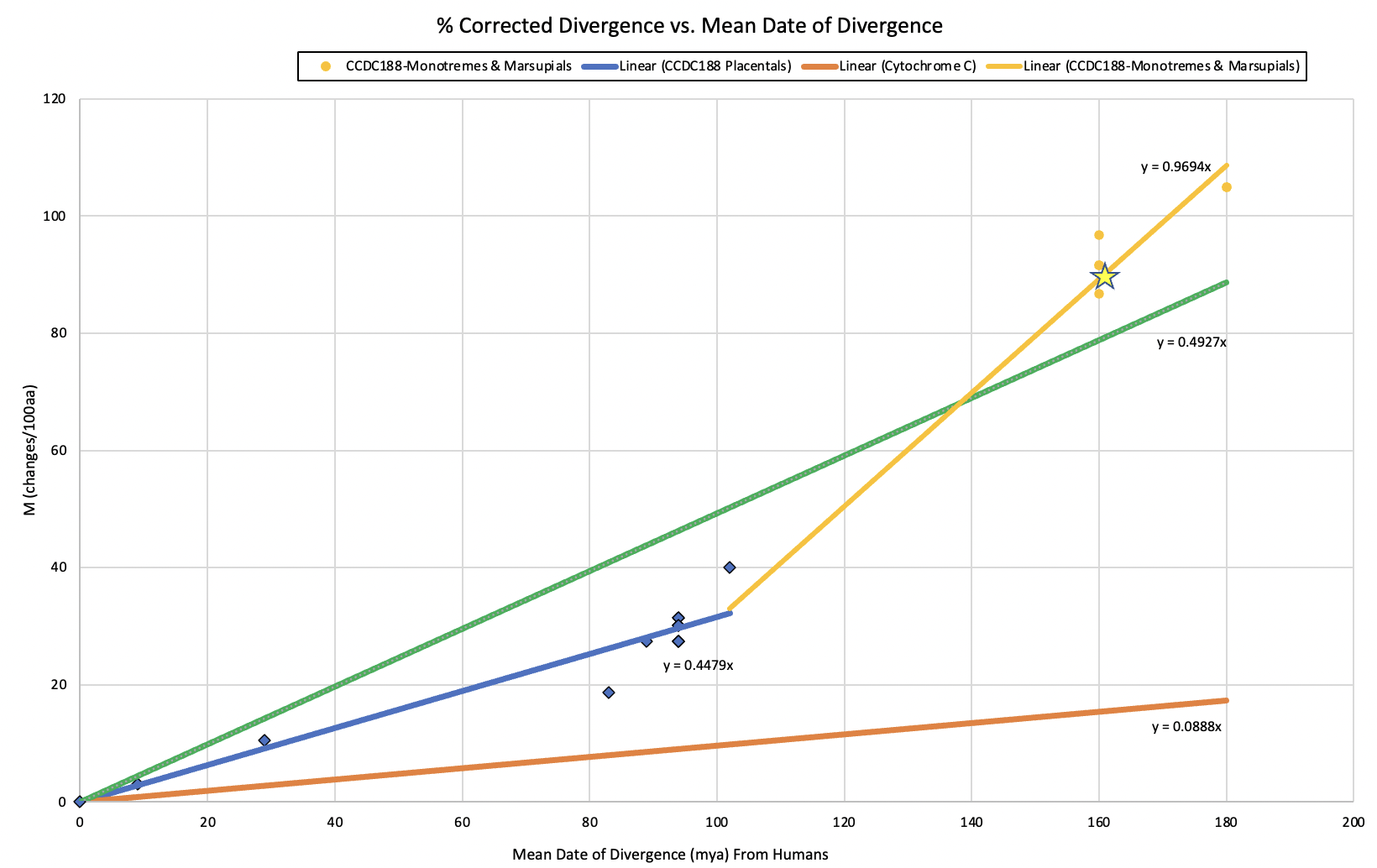
CCDC188 Rate of Evolution

== Pathology ==
A nonsense mutation in the coding region of CCDC188 has been implicated in retinitis pigmentosa, a retinal degeneration process marked by uncontrolled death of rod cells. CCDC188 is also deleted in 22q11.2 deletion syndrome.

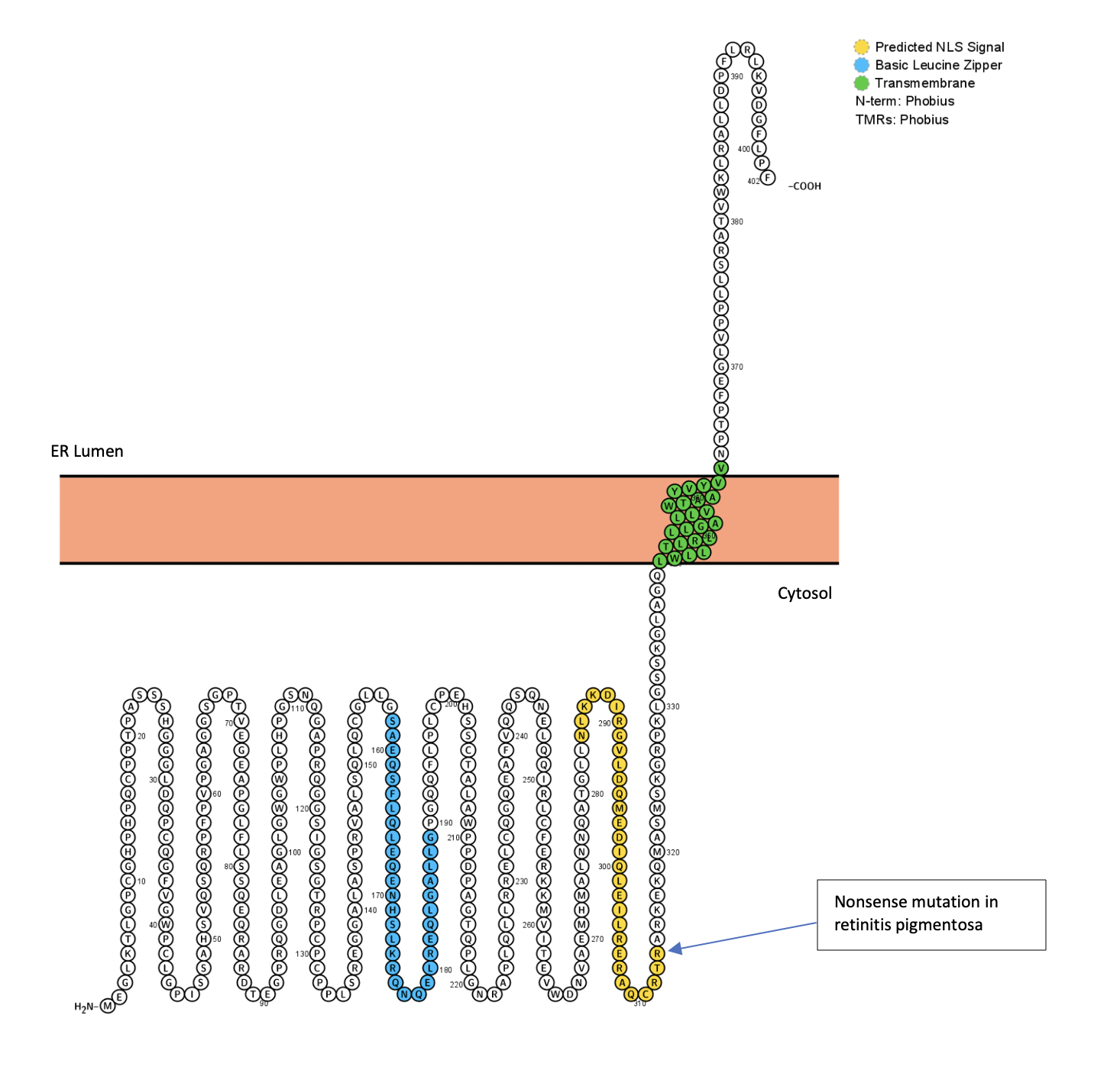
Diagram of CCDC188 and Nonsense Mutation Seen in Retinitis Pigmentosa
