= INTS15 =

Human protein-encoding gene on chromosome 7

Identifiers
- Aliases: INTS15, chromosome 7 open reading frame 26, C7orf26, integrator complex subunit 15
- External IDs: MGI: 2442621; GeneCards: INTS15

Gene location (Human)
Chr.	Chromosome 7 (human)
Band	7p22.1	Start	6,590,021 bp
Band	7p22.1	End	6,608,726 bp

Gene location (Mouse)
Chr.	Chromosome 5 (mouse)
Band	5|5 G2	Start	143,286,950 bp
Band	5|5 G2	End	143,301,115 bp
RNA expression pattern
Bgee	Human / Mouse (ortholog); Top expressed in: granulocyte; canal of the cervix; left uterine tube; body of uterus; gastric mucosa; ganglionic eminence; right lobe of thyroid gland; body of stomach; spleen; right hemisphere of cerebellum / Top expressed in: Rostral migratory stream; genital tubercle; tail of embryo; renal corpuscle; epiblast; mandibular prominence; maxillary prominence; somite; internal carotid artery; ventricular zone; More reference expression data
BioGPS	n/a
Orthologs
Databases	NCBI: entry; OMA: entry
Species	Human	Mouse
Entrez	79034	231868
Ensembl	ENSG00000146576	ENSMUSG00000039244
UniProt	Q96N11	Q8BGA7
RefSeq (mRNA)	NM_001303039; NM_024067	NM_172726
RefSeq (protein)	NP_001289968; NP_076972	NP_766314
Location (UCSC)	Chr 7: 6.59 – 6.61 Mb	Chr 5: 143.29 – 143.3 Mb
PubMed search
- Wikidata
View/Edit Human	View/Edit Mouse

Integrator complex subunit 15, also known as C7orf26, is a protein encoded in humans by the INTS15 gene. Based on properties of c7orf26 and its conservation over a long period of time, its suggested function is targeted for the cytoplasm and it is predicted to play a role in regulating transcription.

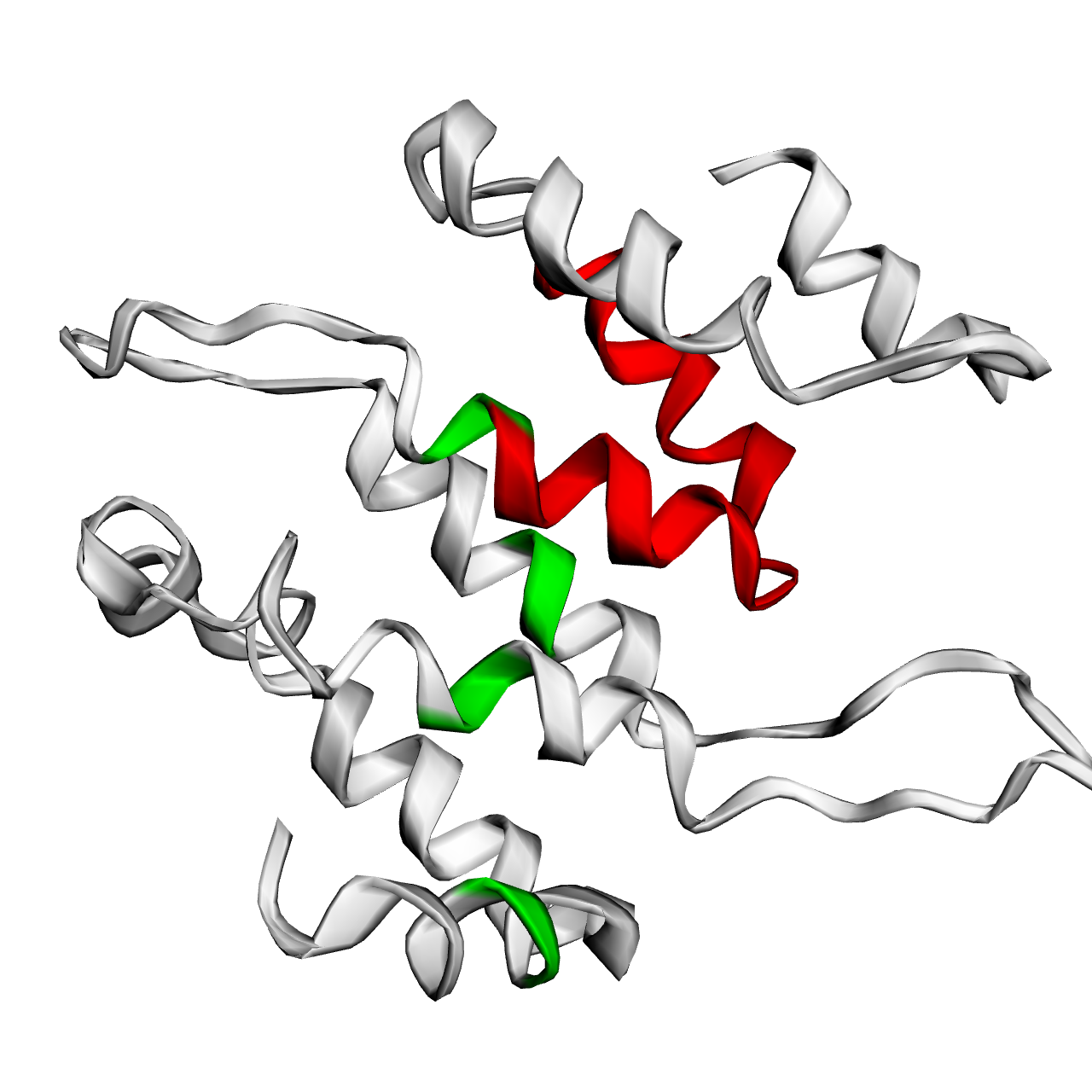
Predicted tertiary structure of c7orf26 with leucine zipper elements highlighted in red, and dileucine components highlighted in green.

== Gene ==
=== Background ===
Chromosome 7 is one of the 23 pairs of chromosomes in the human body, and spans about 159 million base pairs and represents about 5-5.5% of the total DNA in cells. Changes to the structure of chromosome 7 can result in a number of genetic abnormalities, including Williams Syndrome which causes structural and cosmetic changes to the human body, ultimately resulting in a shorter lifespan. There are hundreds of known open reading frames (ORF) along the domain of chromosome 7, however there is not much known about the 26th reading frame, which is of considerable interest.

Currently, two isoforms of c7orf26 are known in Homo Sapiens and are referred to as isoforms 1 and 2, respectively.

=== Location ===
Location of c7orf26 on chromosome 7

c7orf26 (accession: NM_024067 / NP_076972; alias: MGC-2178) is located on the long arm of chromosome 7 (7p22.1), starting at 6590021 and ending at 6608726. The c7orf26 gene spans 2178 base pairs and is orientated on the + strand. The coding region is made up of a protein sequence measuring 449 amino acids long. It is divided into 6 transcripts containing a total of 24 exons on the forward strand and has 5952 unique Single Nucleotide Polymorphisms (SNPs).

=== Gene neighborhood ===
Genes ZDHHC4, ZNF853 and ZNF316 neighbor c7orf26 on chromosome 7. Gene ZDHHC4 is a zinc-finger protein involved with cytochrome-c oxidase activity and protein-cysteine S-palmitoyltransferase activity and has overlapping regions with c7orf26. Gene GRID2IP lies upstream by >2000 bp of c7orf26, and is heavily involved with in synaptogenesis and synaptic plasticity.

=== Expression ===
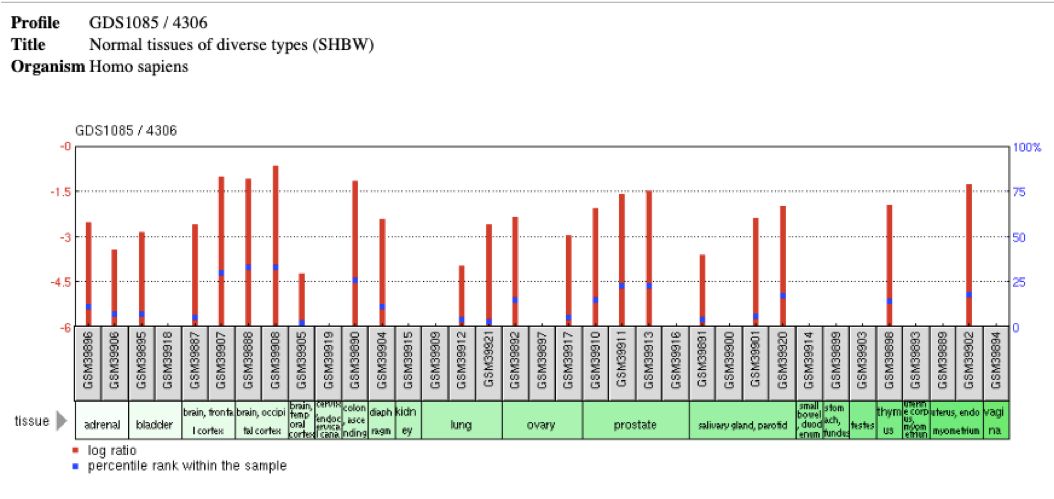
Diagram depicting the expression of c7orf26 in tissues throughout the body.

c7orf26 is highly expressed in lymphatic, reproductive, and nervous tissue. These include the brain (frontal and occipital cortex), thymus glands, salivary glands, endometrium, cervix, and prostate. It is intermediately expressed in the lungs.

== Homology ==
=== Paralogs ===
No paralogs of c7orf26 have been found in the human genome, however, six unique isoforms have been identified. They are c7orf26 isoform (X1, X2, X3, X4) and isoform 2 (two sub-isoforms identified).

=== Orthologs ===
Below is a table of a variety of orthologs of the human c7orf26. The table include closely, intermediately and distantly related orthologs. Orthologs of the human protein c7orf26 are listed above in descending order of the date of divergence. c7orf26 is highly conserved throughout all orthologs, this is demonstrated with a 65% identity in the least similar ortholog. c7orf26 has evolved slowly and evenly over time.

Genus Species	Common name	Taxonomy	Date of Divergency (MYA)	Sequence length (# amino acids)	Sequence identity (%)	Sequence similarity
Lingula anatina	Lingulata	Invertebrata	916	406	72%	66%
Cryptotermes secundus	West Indian Drywood Termite	Invertebrata	797	403	77%	70%
Saccoglossus kowalevskii	Acorn Worm	Invertebrata	794	407	86%	81%
Python bivittatus	Burmese Python	Reptilia	286	329	72%	66%
Colius striatus	Speckled Mousebird	Aves	273	309	87%	83%
Callorhinchus milii	Australian Ghostshark	Chondrichthyes	177	441	70%	57%
Cynoglossus semilaevis	Tonguefish	Osteichthyes	128	307	67%	52%
Amphiprion ocellaris	Clownfish	Osteichthyes	117	481	65%	50%
Elephantulus edwardii	Cape Elephant Shrew	Mammalia	105	445	91%	88%
Piliocolobus tephrosceles	Ugandan Red Colobus	Mammalia	102	449	88%	84%
Theropithecus gelada	Bleeding Heart Monkey	Primate	43.6	617	91%	88%
Saimiri boliviensis boliviensis	Black Capped Squirrel Monkey	Primate	43.2	585	92%	90%
Homo Sapiens	Human	Primate	0	449	100%	100%

=== Phylogeny ===
Below is a phylogenetic tree showing the evolutionary history of c7orf26 and its nearest orthologs.

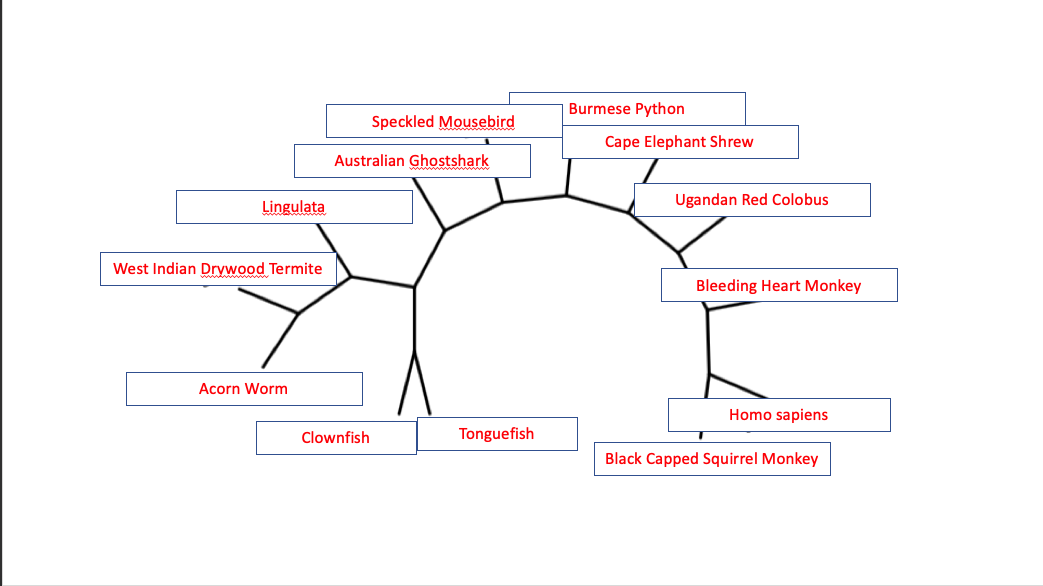
Phylogenetic Tree of nearest orthologs of c7orf26

== Protein ==
=== General properties ===
The molecular weight of c7orf26 is 50 kilodaltons. The isoelectric point is 7.61. The protein sequence is uniquely rich for leucine at 15.8% of its composition, this may indicate a leucine-zipper. Further analysis from PSORT indicates that a leucine-zipper region is found at amino acid 318 and lasts until position 340 (22 amino acids long). There are no extremes with regards to acidity and alkalinity. c7orf26 has a positive charge cluster from amino acid 245 – 275 and does not have any negative, or mixed charge clusters.

=== Composition ===
An even distribution of amino acids compose c7orf26. The percent composition of each amino acid is fairly consistent throughout the orthologs of the protein. The most distant ortholog displays the most variance in amino acid composition. There is a higher percent composition of tyrosine, histidine and leucine and a lower composition of valine and alanine.

=== Post-translational modifications ===
c7orf26 is highly phosphorylated post modified. There are 66 predicted phosphorylated sites according to the NetPhos predictor of phosphorylation sites. There are 4 unique sumoylation sites according to SUMOplot/SUMOsp programs. Sumoylation sites are involved in a number of cellular processes, including nuclear-cytosolic transport, transcriptional regulation and protein stability.

According DAS-TMFilter Server, c7orf26 has zero predicted transmembrane sites or transmembrane protein coding regions, therefore, it can be inferred with certainty that c7orf26 is not a transmembrane protein.

=== Secondary structure ===
Using the GOR (Garnier-Osguthorpe-Robson) method, it can be inferred that c7orf26 has unique secondary structure composed of alpha helices, random coil regions and extended strands. Random coil regions are most found in c7orf26, as they constitute 53.23% of the protein, while alpha helices constitute 34.30% and extended strands 12.47%.

=== Subcellular localization ===
According to PSORT, c7orf26 is predicted to be localized in the cytoplasm with 70.6% confidence.

=== Interacting proteins ===
c7orf26 interacts uniquely with 11 different proteins, according to the Mentha interactome browser. In particular, c7orf26 interacts with the entire family of 'INTS' (Integrator Complex Subunit 1–7). The Integrator Complex associates with the C-terminal domain of RNA polymerase II large subunit. It is involved in the transcription and processing of their transcripts. INTS mediates recruitment of cytoplasmic dynein to the nuclear envelope.

Outside of the INTS gene family, c7orf26 interacts with AK5, HDGF, and ASUN.

== Clinical significance ==
According to Guirato et al. (2018), there may be some evidence that regions on chromosome 7 may be directly linked to a nuclear estrogen receptor (ESR2) that modulates cancer cell proliferation and tumor growth. In another journal article by Fu et al. (2014), there is further indication that regions along chromosome 7, located between open reading frames 20-30, directly correlate to cellular functions of a hepatoma-derived growth factor (HDGF), another way of expressing normal function in tumorigenesis.
