= KIAA2013 =

Protein-coding gene in humans

Identifiers
- Aliases: KIAA2013
- External IDs: MGI: 1924284; GeneCards: KIAA2013

Gene location (Human)
| Chr. | Chromosome 1 (human) |
| Band | 1p36.22 | Start | 11,919,591 bp |
| Band | 1p36.22 | End | 11,926,428 bp |

Gene location (Mouse)
| Chr. | Chromosome 4 (mouse) |
| Band | 4|4 E1 | Start | 148,025,352 bp |
| Band | 4|4 E1 | End | 148,031,771 bp |
RNA expression pattern
| Bgee | Human / Mouse (ortholog); Top expressed in: mucosa of ileum; myocardium of left ventricle; mucosa of transverse colon; skin of arm; cardiac muscle tissue of right atrium; tibialis anterior muscle; Skeletal muscle tissue of rectus abdominis; duodenum; Descending thoracic aorta; blood / Top expressed in: Paneth cell; ascending aorta; seminal vesicula; aortic valve; tunica media of zone of aorta; left colon; body of femur; granulocyte; tunica adventitia of aorta; stroma of bone marrow; More reference expression data |
| BioGPS | n/a |
Orthologs
| Databases | NCBI: entry; OMA: entry |
| Species | Human | Mouse |
| Entrez | 90231 | 77034 |
| Ensembl | ENSG00000116685 | ENSMUSG00000044496 |
| UniProt | Q8IYS2 | Q91X21 |
| RefSeq (mRNA) | NM_138346 | NM_029841 |
| RefSeq (protein) | NP_612355 | NP_084117 |
| Location (UCSC) | Chr 1: 11.92 – 11.93 Mb | Chr 4: 148.03 – 148.03 Mb |
| PubMed search |
- Wikidata
| View/Edit Human | View/Edit Mouse |

Uncharacterized protein KIAA2013, also known as Q8IYS2 or MGC33867, is a single-pass transmembrane protein encoded by the KIAA2013 gene in humans. The complete function of KIAA2013 has not yet been fully elucidated.

== Gene ==
The KIAA2013 gene is located on the short arm of chromosome 1, in location 36.22 (1p36.22). It can be found on the minus strand of the previously mentioned chromosome, running from 11,986,485 to 11,979,643. The gene contains 3 exons, 2 introns, and is 6,838 base pairs long.

== mRNA ==
=== Splice variants ===
There are two alternate splice variants. One retains a transcript length of 2539 bp and the other retains a transcript length of 2170.

== Structure ==
The longest mRNA splice variant of the KIAA2013 protein contains 634 amino acid residues. The predicted weight of the protein is 69.2 kDa and its isoelectric point is 8.44. There is also a lysine multiplet of six amino acid residues in a row, beginning in position 28. This sequence, however, is located within the cleavable signal peptide and will most likely not remain a part of the mature protein.

=== Conserved domains ===
KIAA2013 contains one conserved protein domain of unknown function by the name of DUF2152, or pfam10222. This protein has remained conserved from mammals to invertebrates. The conserved domain extends from amino acid position 6 to 629.

=== Secondary structure ===
Secondary structure as analyzed via GOR4:

| Structure | Percentage |
|---|---|
| Alpha helix | 38% |
| Beta sheet | 61.2% |

=== Tertiary structure ===
An AlphaFold prediction has been generated that was further analyzed through the use of iCn3D. The following images highlight the transmembrane regions of the KIAA2013 protein, as well as the three disulfide bridges that can be seen to form.

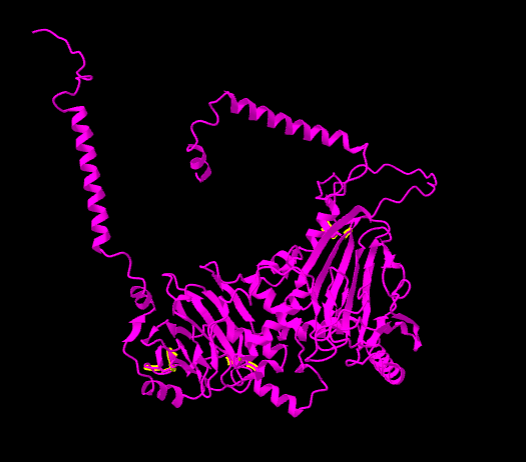
iCn3D rendering of tertiary structure of KIAA2013 with the three disulfide bridges shown to form

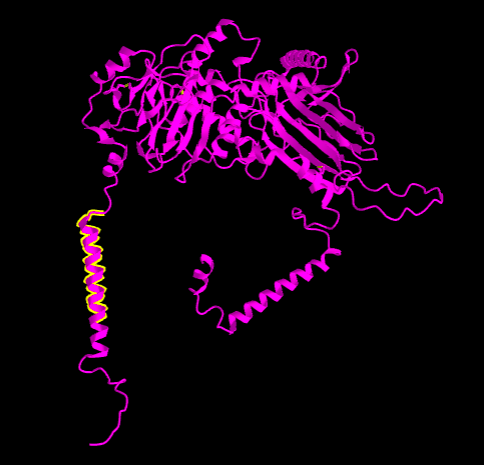
iCn3D illustration of the transmembrane region of the KIAA2013 protein. This region is entirely a helical structure.

== Gene level regulation ==
=== Promoter ===
The singular human KIAA2013 promoter is a 1194 bp long sequence that precedes the gene.

=== Transcription factor binding sites ===
There are hundreds of possible transcription factor binding sites that can be found on the promoter sequence of KIAA2013. Here is a list of some that retain a high matrix similarity:

- Myeloid zinc finger MZF1
- Zinc finger protein 750
- FOXP1
- KRAB-containing zinc finger protein 300

=== Tissue expression ===
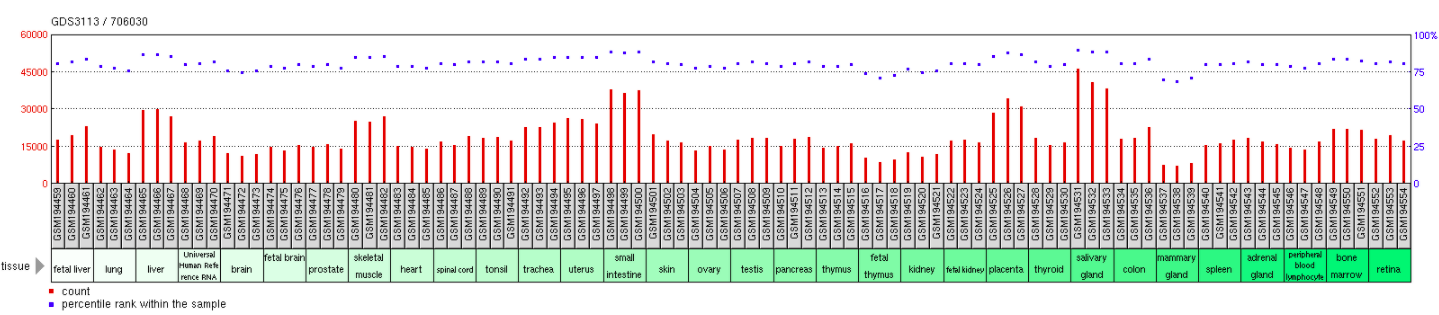
NCBI GEO KIAA2013 expression data as it stands regarding normal tissue samples in the human body

The KIAA2013 protein has been shown to be expressed ubiquitously across many differing human tissues. However, studies suggest that the small intestine, most specifically the duodenum, as well as the colon and kidneys express higher levels of this protein. RNA-seq data has indicated that this gene is also expressed within the intestine of 20-week-old fetuses. NCBI GEO data of preimplantation embryos indicates that KIAA2013 expression begins to be expressed in high amounts after the 4-cell embryo has developed.

== Transcript level regulation ==
=== 3' UTR ===
As can be seen in the image, this final portion of the KIAA2013 3' UTR contains the poly-A signal as well as multiple ELAVL1 miRNA binding sites. ELAVL1 is a necessary RNA binding protein during the process of placental branching and general embryonic development. Out of the womb, ELAVL1 promotes angiogenesis, or the formation of new blood vessels.

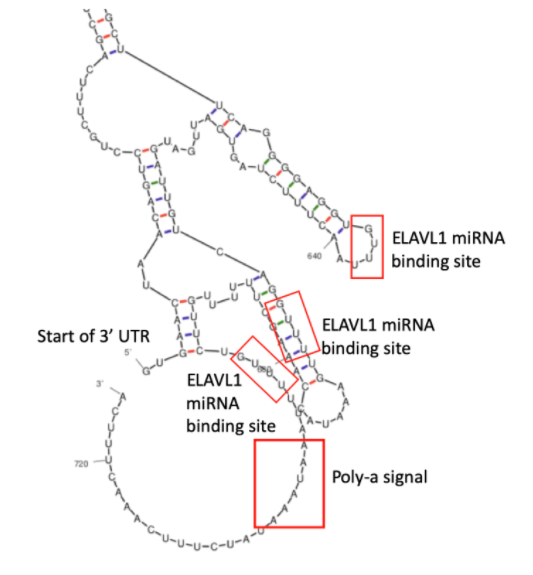
This image captures the end of the 3' UTR, wherein several ELAVL1 miRNA binding sites and one poly-A site can be seen.

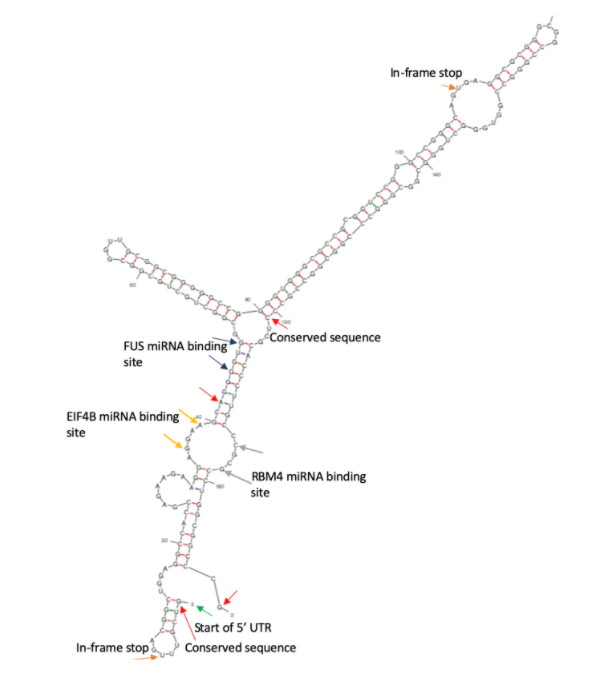
5' UTR illustrating the miRNA binding sites of EIF4b, FUS, RBM4, as well as a couple of stop codons

=== 5' UTR ===
The 5' UTR has two main conserved regions, located at the very beginning and very end of the sequence. Not only that, but it has two sequences coding for stop codons, as can be seen in the image. Most miRNA seem to congregate around the two conserved domains. EIF4B is known as eukaryotic translation initiation factor 4B and is needed to bind mRNAs to ribosomes as well as assist with the translation of longer 5' UTRs. It binds to the mRNA in the presence of ATP. FUS actually mediates gene silencing. It has also been clinically linked with ALS diagnosis cases. Finally, RBM4 helps to control translation as well as alternative splicing events. Reduced expression of this miRNA has been linked to Down syndrome.

== Protein level regulation ==
=== Subcellular localization ===
KIAA2013 has been found to intracellularly localize to the Golgi apparatus and endoplasmic reticulum. This has been validated through the use of GFP fusion and antibody specific experimentation. DeepLoc analysis has indicated that there is an 81.94% chance that this protein is found in the Golgi apparatus and 16.77% that it is localized to the endoplasmic reticulum. The likelihood that KIAA2013 is a membrane protein sits at 99.98%.

=== Post-translational modifications ===
There is a predicted signal peptide spanning across amino acids 1–40. The cleavage site for this signal peptide is located between amino acid positions 40 and 41. There are also a collection of post-translational modifications that can be connected with KIAA2013. They include:

KIAA2013 Post-Translational Modifications
| Modification | Location |
|---|---|
| Glycosylation | T224 |
| Glycosylation | N363 |
| Phosphorylation | S159 |
| Phosphorylation | S381 |
| Ubiquitylation | K629 |

== Homology ==
=== Paralogs ===
There are currently no known paralogs of KIAA2013.

=== Pseudogene ===
KIAA2013 has one pseudogene found within Homo sapiens named LOC728138. The length of this pseudogene is 633 amino acid residues and it shares a 96.8% sequence identity with KIAA2013.

=== Orthologs ===
There are orthologs for KIAA2013 ranging from mammals all the way back to invertebrates. As of now, there are 419 organisms that are known to contain orthologs of this gene.

Table of KIAA2013 Orthologs
| KIAA2013 | Genus, species | Common name | Divergence Date (MYA) | Accession number | Protein Length | Seq. Identity | Seq. Similarity |
|---|---|---|---|---|---|---|---|
| Mammalia | Homo sapiens | Human | 0 | NP_612355.1 | 634 | 100% | 100% |
| | Mus caroli | Ryuku mouse | 90 | XP_021016690.1 | 634 | 91.8% | 95.9% |
| | Mirounga leonina | Southern elephant seal | 94 | XP_034875674.1 | 629 | 94.8% | 96.8% |
| | Felis catus | Cat | 96 | XP_003989629.3 | 634 | 94.8% | 97.1% |
| Aves | Falco rusticolus | Gyrfalcon | 312 | XP_037236550.1 | 612 | 61.7% | 71% |
| Reptilia | Gopherus evgoodei | Goode's thornscrub tortoise | 312 | XP_030393408.1 | 623 | 64.9% | 74.9% |
| Amphibian | Xenopus laevis | African clawed frog | 352 | XP_018083185.1 | 614 | 55.5% | 69.1% |
| | Microcaecelia unicolor | Tiny Cayenne Caecilian | 352 | XP_030078049.1 | 623 | 53% | 68.4% |
| Fish | Acipenser ruthenus | Sterlet | 435 | XP_033899255.2 | 610 | 56.5% | 69.3% |
| | Lepisosteus oculatus | Spotted gar | 435 | XP_006642029.2 | 623 | 55.1% | 68.1% |
| Invertebrates | Anopheles merus | Mosquito | 797 | XP_041777166.1 | 625 | 27.5% | 44.5% |
| | Pollicipes pollicipes | Goose Neck Barnacle | 797 | XP_037086897.1 | 639 | 27.6% | 44.3% |
| | Drosophila subpulchrella | Fly | 797 | XP_037708712.1 | 637 | 26% | 43% |
| | Limulus polyphemus | Atlantic Horseshoe crab | 797 | XP_013773544.2 | 516 | 21.8% | 36.8% |

=== Evolution ===
The graph to the right illustrates the rate of divergence of the protein KIAA2013, as compared to cytochrome c and fibrinogen alpha. This graph utilized a molecular clock approach wherein the evolution of the protein KIAA2013 was compared to the rate of the two previously mentioned proteins. Cytochrome c has a much slower rate of divergence as compared to fibrinogen alpha, while KIAA2013 lies in between the two.

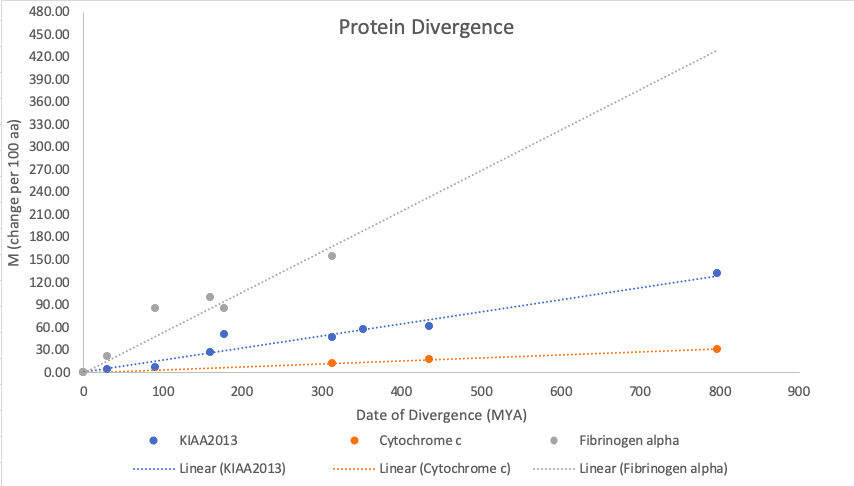
The evolution of KIAA2013, as compared to fibrinogen alpha and cytochrome c

== Interacting proteins ==
KIAA2013 has been found to interact with two proteins: TMEM60 and IBP5 via a validated two-hybrid array.

== Clinical significance ==
KIAA2013 has been found to play a role in the endocannabinoid system. This system is made up of cannabinoid receptors 1 and 2 (CB1 and CB2) as well as the various ligands and enzymes that interact. The protein KIAA2013 has been found to be expressed within CB2 expressing cells. Both cannabinoid receptors are labeled as class A G protein-coupled receptors, and CB2 is highly expressed within the human spleen and leukocytes. CB2, and by extension KIAA2013, are therefore targets of interest for therapeutic studies looking into diseases such as inflammatory bowel disease and rheumatoid arthritis.
