= CKAP4 =

Protein-coding gene in humans

Identifiers
- Aliases: CKAP4, CLIMP-63, ERGIC-63, p63, cytoskeleton-associated protein 4, cytoskeleton associated protein 4, CLIMP63
- External IDs: MGI: 2444926; GeneCards: CKAP4

Gene location (Human)
Chr.	Chromosome 12 (human)
Band	12q23.3	Start	106,237,881 bp
Band	12q23.3	End	106,304,279 bp

Gene location (Mouse)
Chr.	Chromosome 10 (mouse)
Band	10|10 C1	Start	84,362,169 bp
Band	10|10 C1	End	84,369,926 bp
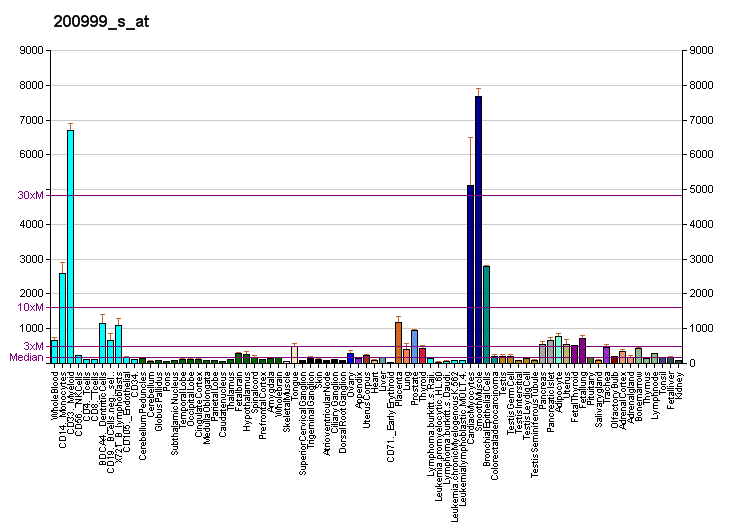

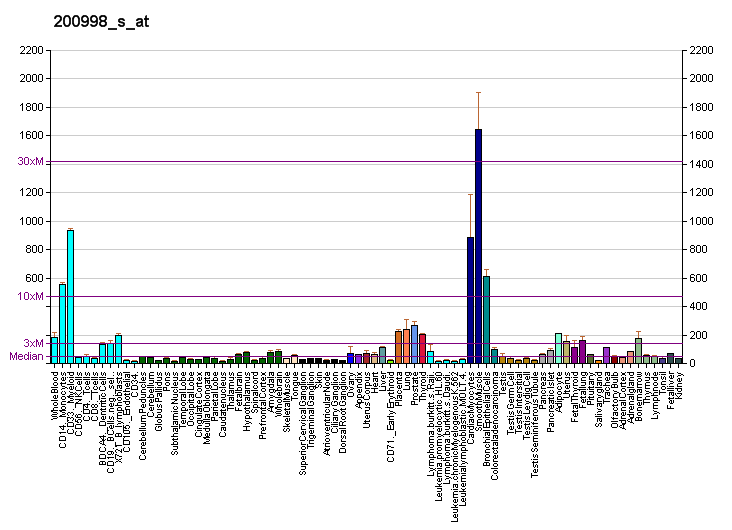
RNA expression pattern
Bgee	Human / Mouse (ortholog); Top expressed in: tibia; gingival epithelium; stromal cell of endometrium; cartilage tissue; buccal mucosa cell; periodontal fiber; pancreatic ductal cell; parietal pleura; germinal epithelium; mucosa of sigmoid colon / Top expressed in: ascending aorta; calvaria; fossa; aortic valve; condyle; granulocyte; tibiofemoral joint; body of femur; Rostral migratory stream; decidua; More reference expression data
BioGPS	More reference expression data
Gene ontology
Molecular function	RNA binding
Cellular component	cytoplasm; perinuclear region of cytoplasm; integral component of membrane; lipid droplet; plasma membrane; lamellar granule; extracellular exosome; cytoskeleton; endoplasmic reticulum membrane; endoplasmic reticulum; membrane; extracellular matrix; cytosol; nuclear speck; azurophil granule membrane; specific granule membrane; endoplasmic reticulum lumen; rough endoplasmic reticulum; cytoplasmic ribonucleoprotein granule
Biological process	neutrophil degranulation; post-translational protein modification
Sources:Amigo / QuickGO
Orthologs
Databases	NCBI: entry; OMA: entry
Species	Human	Mouse
Entrez	10970	216197
Ensembl	ENSG00000136026	ENSMUSG00000046841
UniProt	Q07065	Q8BMK4
RefSeq (mRNA)	NM_006825	NM_175451
RefSeq (protein)	NP_006816	NP_780660
Location (UCSC)	Chr 12: 106.24 – 106.3 Mb	Chr 10: 84.36 – 84.37 Mb
PubMed search
- Wikidata
View/Edit Human	View/Edit Mouse

Cytoskeleton-associated protein 4 is a protein that in humans is encoded by the CKAP4 gene.

CKAP4 also historically known as CLIMP-63 (cytoskeleton-linking membrane protein 63), or just p63 (during the 1990s) is an abundant type II transmembrane protein residing predominantly in the endoplasmic reticulum (ER) of eukaryotic cells and encoded in higher vertebrates by the gene CKAP4.

== Discovery ==
CLIMP-63 was discovered in the early 1990s as the most S-palmitoylated protein during mitosis, Nevertheless, the effect of this modification to date remains unclear. CLIMP-63 was extensively studied during the 1990s by the group of Hans-Peter Hauri (University of Basel, CH) which has characterized CLIMP-63's life in the ER. More recently, different groups have also reported CLIMP-63's presence at the plasma membrane acting as a ligand-activated receptor. CLIMP-63 has also now been described as a marker in different cancers.

== Localization, molecular functions and regulation ==
CLIMP-63's cellular distribution has been assessed (and re-assessed) several times in the last two decades. The protein includes a cytosolic segment composed of positively charged amino acid (2–23) which might act as a preponderant motif for folding and ER localization. Furthermore, CLIMP-63 was one of the first discovered ER-shaping proteins. and is mostly known for participating in the generation and maintenance of the ER sheets This is thought to occur after dimerization of CLIMP-63's luminal COILED-COIL domains in cis (two CLIMP-63 proteins of the same ER membrane layer) and/or trans (between two different ER membrane layers, across the ER lumen). Multimerization might in addition limit CLIMP-63's diffusion out of ER-sheets.

CLIMP-63 was also shown to bind microtubules through its cytoplasmic disordered tail which might help anchoring the ER-sheets to the cytoskeleton. This is regulated by phosphorylation of at least three serine residues of CLIMP-63's cytosolic tail (S3, S17 and S19) as phosphorylation interferes with CLIMP-63's microtubule binding capacity.

In addition, CLIMP-63 can undergo another post-translational modification, S-palmitoylation, on cysteine 100 of its cytoplasmic domain. So far only the palmitoyl-acyltransferase ZDHHC2 has been identified as a potential regulator of CLIMP-63's palmitoylation but as ZDHHC2 resides mostly at the plasma membrane, supplementary investigations are needed. The consequence of S-palmitoylation remain to be investigated but could play a role in the cell cycle as CLIMP-63's palmitoylation was reported to strongly increase during mitosis.

Finally, CLIMP-63 has been shown by different groups to serve as a cell surface receptor for various extracellular ligands, in particular for surfactant protein A (SP-A) in lungs alveoli, tissue plasminogen activator (tPA) in vascular smooth muscle cells and for anti-proliferative factor (APF) in bladder epithelial cells of patients with interstitial cystitis disorder.

== Diseases ==
More recently, CLIMP-63 has been related to different types of cancer prognosis. Upregulation of CLIMP-63 is observed in cholangio-cellular and hepatocellular carcinoma and it correlates with lymph node metastasis appearance.
