= DHHC domain =

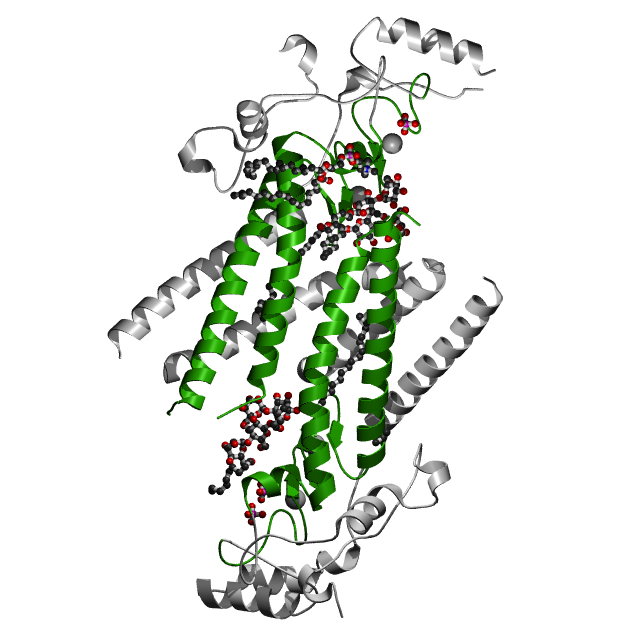
- A DHHC protein dimer from zebrafish (PDB: 6BMS), showing the TM domain in green. The helical domains top and bottom are cytoplasmic DHHC domains.

Identifiers
- Symbol: DHHC
- Pfam: PF01529
- InterPro: IPR001594
- PROSITE: PDOC50216
- OPM superfamily: 476
- OPM protein: 6bmm
Available protein structures:
- Pfam: structures / ECOD
- PDB: RCSB PDB; PDBe; PDBj
- PDBsum: structure summary

A depiction of the topology of DHHC family palmitoyltransferases. Transmembrane alpha helices are represented as black tubes. The DHHC domain is shown as a light orange oval.

In molecular biology the DHHC domain is a protein domain that acts as an enzyme, which adds a palmitoyl chemical group to proteins in order to anchor them to cell membranes. The DHHC domain was discovered in 1999 and named after a conserved sequence motif found in its protein sequence. Roth and colleagues showed that the yeast Akr1p protein could palmitoylate Yck2p in vitro and inferred that the DHHC domain defined a large family of palmitoyltransferases. In mammals twenty three members of this family have been identified and their substrate specificities investigated. Some members of the family such as ZDHHC3 and ZDHHC7 enhance palmitoylation of proteins such as PSD-95, SNAP-25, GAP43, Gαs. Others such as ZDHHC9 showed specificity only toward the H-Ras protein. However, a recent study questions the involvement of classical enzyme-substrate recognition and specificity in the palmitoylation reaction. Several members of the family have been implicated in human diseases.

== Sequence motifs ==
Conserved motifs within protein sequences point towards the most important amino acid residues for function. In the DHHC domain there is a tetrapeptide motif composed of aspartate-histidine-histidine-cysteine. However this short sequence is embedded in a larger region of about fifty amino acids in length that shares many more conserved amino acids. The canonical DHHC domain can be described with the following sequence motif:

C-x2-C-x9-HC-x2-C-x2-C-x4-DHHC-x5-C-x4-N-x3-F (x shows region of unconserved residues)

However many examples of DHHC domains are known that do not contain all these conserved residues. In addition to the central DHHC domain three further sequence motifs have been identified in members of the DHHC family. A DPG (aspartate-proline-glycine) motif has been identified just to the C-terminus of the second transmembrane region. A TTxE (threonine-threonine-any-glutamate) motif has also been identified after the fourth transmembrane helix. A third motif towards the C-terminus of many proteins has been identified that contains a conserved aromatic amino acid, a glycine and an asparagine called the PaCCT motif (PAlmitoiltransferase Conserved C-Terminus motif).

== Structure and mechanism ==
Several structures of the DHHC domain has been solved, and it is known to run on a linearly-arranged catalytic triad of Asp153, His154, and Cys156. It runs on a ping-pong mechanism, where the cysteine attacks the acyl-CoA to form an S-acylated DHHC, and then the acyl group is transferred to the substrate. DHHR enzymes exist, and they (as well as some DHHC enzymes) may use a ternary complex mechanism instead.

== Chemical inhibitors ==
In 2006, five chemical classes of small molecules were discovered which were shown to act against palmitoyltransferases. Further studies in 2009 showed that of the 5 classes studied, 2-(2-hydroxy-5-nitro-benzylidene)-benzo[b]thiophen-3-one was shown to behave similarly to 2-Bromopalmitate and were identified as able to inhibit the palmitoylation reaction of a range of DHHC domain containing proteins. Inhibition with 2-Bromopalmitate was found to be irreversible, the other however was found to be mostly reversible. Because of the roles of DHHC domain proteins in human diseases it has been suggested that chemical inhibitors of specific DHHC proteins may be a potential route to treatment of disease.

== In human disease ==
Several proteins containing DHHC domains have been implicated in human disease. Two missense mutations within the DHHC domain of ZDHHC9 were identified in X-linked mental retardation associated with a Marfanoid Habitus. A potential link of ZDHHC11 with bladder cancer has been suggested by the discovery that 5 out of 9 high-grade bladder cancer samples surveyed contained a duplication of the 5p15.33 genomic region. However, this region contains another gene TPPP which may be the causative gene. The HIP14 palmitoyltransferase is responsible for palmitoylating the Huntingtin protein. Expansions of the triplet repeat in the huntington's gene leads to loss of interaction with HIP14 which Yanai and colleagues speculate is involved in the pathology of Huntington's disease. A gene knockout experiment of the mouse homologue of ZDHHC13 showed hair loss, severe osteoporosis, and systemic amyloidosis, both of AL and AA depositions.

== Human proteins containing this domain ==
ZDHHC1; ZDHHC2; ZDHHC3; ZDHHC4; ZDHHC5; ZDHHC6; ZDHHC7; ZDHHC8; ZDHHC9; ZDHHC11; ZDHHC11B; ZDHHC12; ZDHHC13; ZDHHC14; ZDHHC15; ZDHHC16; ZDHHC17; ZDHHC18; ZDHHC19; ZDHHC20; ZDHHC21; ZDHHC22; ZDHHC23; ZDHHC24;

== See also ==
- Palmitoylation
- Palmitic acid
