= ZDHHC9 =

Protein-coding gene in the species Homo sapiens

Identifiers
- Aliases: ZDHHC9, CGI89, CXorf11, DHHC9, MMSA1, MRXSZ, ZDHHC10, ZNF379, ZNF380, zinc finger DHHC-type containing 9, zinc finger DHHC-type palmitoyltransferase 9, MRXSR
- External IDs: OMIM: 300646; MGI: 2444393; GeneCards: ZDHHC9
Enzyme activity
EC #	BRENDA	ExPASy	KEGG	MetaCyc
2.3.1.225	↗	↗	↗	↗

Gene location (Human)
Chr.	X chromosome (human)
Band	Xq26.1	Start	129,803,288 bp
Band	Xq26.1	End	129,843,909 bp

Gene location (Mouse)
Chr.	X chromosome (mouse)
Band	X|X A4	Start	47,260,846 bp
Band	X|X A4	End	47,297,755 bp
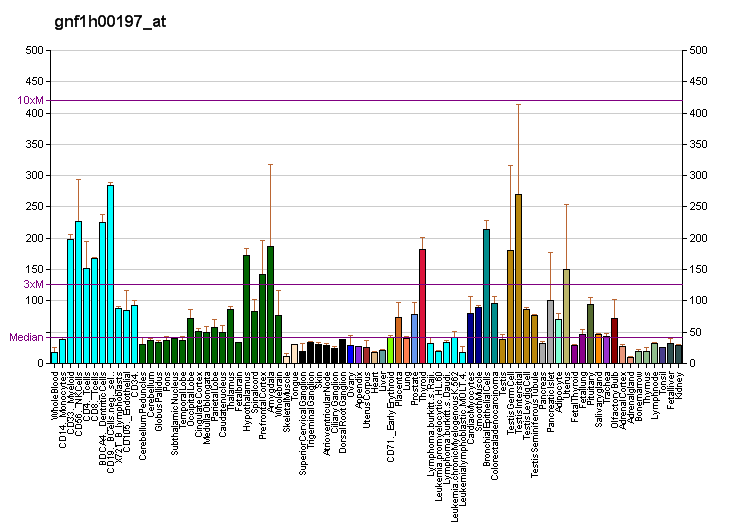
RNA expression pattern
Bgee	Human / Mouse (ortholog); Top expressed in: corpus callosum; inferior ganglion of vagus nerve; skin of arm; external globus pallidus; subthalamic nucleus; mucosa of ileum; internal globus pallidus; C1 segment; pars reticulata; ventral tegmental area / Top expressed in: esophagus; lip; right kidney; epithelium of small intestine; left lobe of liver; ileum; intestinal villus; crypt of lieberkuhn of small intestine; tail of embryo; granulocyte; More reference expression data
BioGPS	More reference expression data
Gene ontology
Molecular function	protein-cysteine S-palmitoyltransferase activity; Ras palmitoyltransferase activity; transferase activity; acyltransferase activity; protein binding; palmitoyltransferase activity
Cellular component	integral component of membrane; palmitoyltransferase complex; Golgi membrane; Golgi apparatus; intrinsic component of Golgi membrane; endoplasmic reticulum membrane; endoplasmic reticulum; membrane; cytosol
Biological process	peptidyl-L-cysteine S-palmitoylation; protein palmitoylation; protein targeting to membrane
Sources:Amigo / QuickGO
Orthologs
Databases	NCBI: entry; OMA: entry
Species	Human	Mouse
Entrez	51114	208884
Ensembl	ENSG00000188706	ENSMUSG00000036985
UniProt	Q9Y397	P59268
RefSeq (mRNA)	NM_001008222; NM_016032	NM_172465
RefSeq (protein)	NP_001008223; NP_057116	NP_766053
Location (UCSC)	Chr X: 129.8 – 129.84 Mb	Chr X: 47.26 – 47.3 Mb
PubMed search
- Wikidata
View/Edit Human	View/Edit Mouse

Palmitoyltransferase ZDHHC9 is an enzyme that in humans is encoded by the ZDHHC9 gene that contains a DHHC domain.
