= ZDHHC3 =

Protein-coding gene in the species Homo sapiens

Identifiers
- Aliases: ZDHHC3, DHHC-3, GODZ, ZNF373, zinc finger DHHC-type containing 3, DHHC3, zinc finger DHHC-type palmitoyltransferase 3
- External IDs: OMIM: 617150; MGI: 1926134; GeneCards: ZDHHC3
Enzyme activity
EC #	BRENDA	ExPASy	KEGG	MetaCyc
2.3.1.225	↗	↗	↗	↗

Gene location (Human)
Chr.	Chromosome 3 (human)
Band	3p21.31	Start	44,915,257 bp
Band	3p21.31	End	44,976,185 bp

Gene location (Mouse)
Chr.	Chromosome 9 (mouse)
Band	9|9 F4	Start	123,066,160 bp
Band	9|9 F4	End	123,113,205 bp
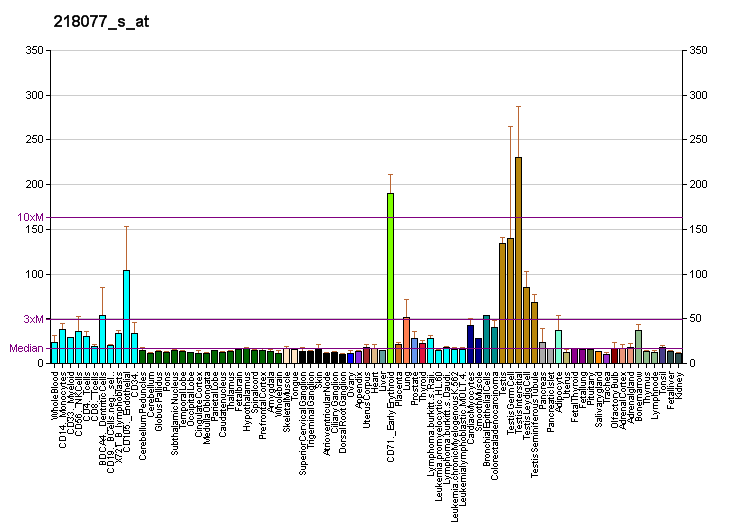

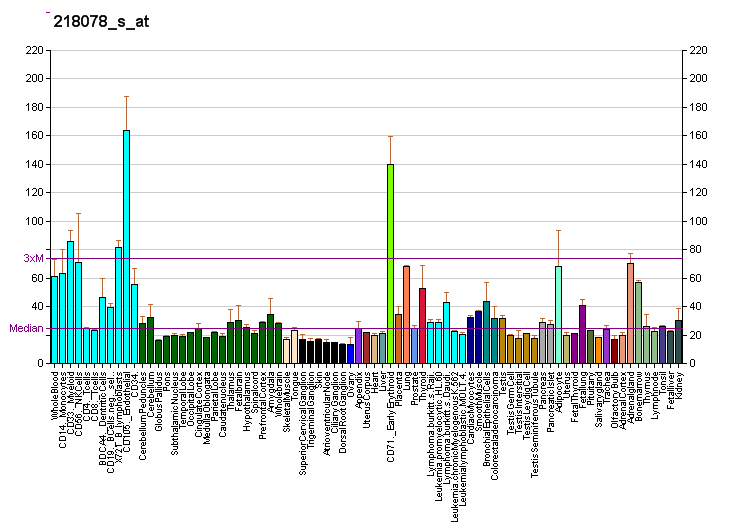
RNA expression pattern
Bgee	Human / Mouse (ortholog); Top expressed in: left testis; right testis; rectum; stromal cell of endometrium; skin of leg; left adrenal gland; right adrenal gland; sperm; skin of abdomen; left adrenal cortex / Top expressed in: granulocyte; muscle of thigh; lip; tail of embryo; genital tubercle; pontine nuclei; left lung; epiblast; dorsal tegmental nucleus; yolk sac; More reference expression data
BioGPS	More reference expression data
Gene ontology
Molecular function	protein-cysteine S-palmitoyltransferase activity; palmitoyltransferase activity; transferase activity; acyltransferase activity
Cellular component	integral component of membrane; Golgi membrane; Golgi apparatus; membrane; endoplasmic reticulum
Biological process	protein targeting; protein palmitoylation; protein targeting to membrane; peptidyl-L-cysteine S-palmitoylation; localization within membrane; protein localization to photoreceptor outer segment
Sources:Amigo / QuickGO
Orthologs
Databases	NCBI: entry; OMA: entry
Species	Human	Mouse
Entrez	51304	69035
Ensembl	ENSG00000163812	ENSMUSG00000025786
UniProt	Q9NYG2	Q8R173
RefSeq (mRNA)	NM_001135179; NM_001135180; NM_016598; NM_001330761; NM_001349376 NM_001349377; NM_001349378; NM_001349379; NM_001349380; NM_001349381	NM_026917
RefSeq (protein)	NP_001128651; NP_001317690; NP_057682; NP_001336305; NP_001336306 NP_001336307; NP_001336308; NP_001336309; NP_001336310	NP_081193; NP_001359467; NP_001359468; NP_001359469; NP_001359470 NP_001359471; NP_001359472; NP_001359473; NP_001359475; NP_001359476; NP_001359477; NP_001359478; NP_001359479; NP_001359480; NP_001359481; NP_001359482
Location (UCSC)	Chr 3: 44.92 – 44.98 Mb	Chr 9: 123.07 – 123.11 Mb
PubMed search
- Wikidata
View/Edit Human	View/Edit Mouse

Palmitoyltransferase ZDHHC3 is an enzyme that in humans is encoded by the ZDHHC3 gene that contains a DHHC domain.
