= ZDHHC17 =

Protein-coding gene in the species Homo sapiens

Identifiers
- Aliases: ZDHHC17, HIP14, HIP3, HYPH, HSPC294, zinc finger DHHC-type containing 17, DHHC-17, zinc finger DHHC-type palmitoyltransferase 17, DHHC17
- External IDs: OMIM: 607799; MGI: 2445110; GeneCards: ZDHHC17
Available structures
PDB	Ortholog search: PDBe RCSB
PDB	List of PDB id codes 3EU9
Enzyme activity
EC #	BRENDA	ExPASy	KEGG	MetaCyc
2.3.1.225	↗	↗	↗	↗

Gene location (Human)
Chr.	Chromosome 12 (human)
Band	12q21.2	Start	76,764,103 bp
Band	12q21.2	End	76,853,696 bp

Gene location (Mouse)
Chr.	Chromosome 10 (mouse)
Band	10|10 D1	Start	110,777,641 bp
Band	10|10 D1	End	110,846,001 bp
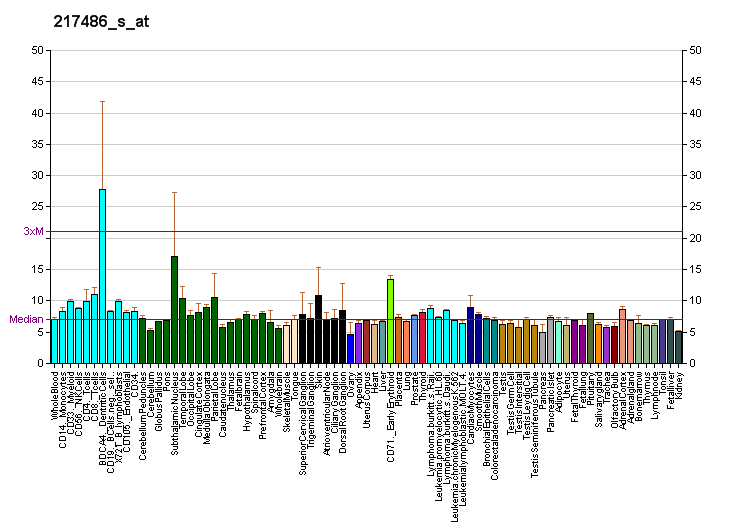
RNA expression pattern
Bgee	Human / Mouse (ortholog); Top expressed in: corpus callosum; cerebellar vermis; Brodmann area 23; lateral nuclear group of thalamus; external globus pallidus; pars compacta; superior vestibular nucleus; pars reticulata; subthalamic nucleus; pons / Top expressed in: neural layer of retina; gastrula; Rostral migratory stream; lobe of cerebellum; cerebellar vermis; ascending aorta; nucleus of stria terminalis; otolith organ; inferior colliculi; utricle; More reference expression data
BioGPS	More reference expression data
Gene ontology
Molecular function	protein-cysteine S-palmitoyltransferase activity; transferase activity; magnesium ion transmembrane transporter activity; signal transducer activity; palmitoyltransferase activity; protein binding; identical protein binding; acyltransferase activity
Cellular component	integral component of membrane; Golgi apparatus; intracellular membrane-bounded organelle; membrane; Golgi membrane; Golgi-associated vesicle membrane; cytoplasmic vesicle membrane; cytoplasmic vesicle; presynaptic membrane; plasma membrane; synapse; cell junction; cytosol
Biological process	protein palmitoylation; positive regulation of I-kappaB kinase/NF-kappaB signaling; lipoprotein transport; signal transduction; magnesium ion transmembrane transport
Sources:Amigo / QuickGO
Orthologs
Databases	NCBI: entry; OMA: entry
Species	Human	Mouse
Entrez	23390	320150
Ensembl	ENSG00000186908	ENSMUSG00000035798
UniProt	Q8IUH5	Q80TN5
RefSeq (mRNA)	NM_015336; NM_001359626	NM_172554; NM_001359622; NM_001359624
RefSeq (protein)	NP_056151; NP_001346555	NP_766142; NP_001346551; NP_001346553
Location (UCSC)	Chr 12: 76.76 – 76.85 Mb	Chr 10: 110.78 – 110.85 Mb
PubMed search
- Wikidata
View/Edit Human	View/Edit Mouse

Palmitoyltransferase ZDHHC17 is an enzyme that contains a DHHC domain that in humans is encoded by the ZDHHC17 gene.

== Interactions ==
ZDHHC17 has been shown to interact with Huntingtin.
