= CREB/ATF bZIP transcription factor =

Protein-coding gene in the species Homo sapiens

CREBZF

Identifiers
- Aliases: CREBZF, SMILE, ZF, CREB/ATF bZIP transcription factor
- External IDs: OMIM: 606444; MGI: 2675296; GeneCards: CREBZF

Gene location (Human)
Chr.	Chromosome 11 (human)
Band	11q14.1	Start	85,659,708 bp
Band	11q14.1	End	85,682,908 bp

Gene location (Mouse)
Chr.	Chromosome 7 (mouse)
Band	7|7 E1	Start	90,091,937 bp
Band	7|7 E1	End	90,097,202 bp
RNA expression pattern
Bgee	Human / Mouse (ortholog); Top expressed in: sural nerve; left ovary; right ovary; body of uterus; right hemisphere of cerebellum; cardia; ventricular zone; right lung; canal of the cervix; left lobe of thyroid gland / Top expressed in: neural layer of retina; ventricular zone; genital tubercle; cerebellar cortex; thymus; tail of embryo; spermatocyte; lobe of cerebellum; ganglionic eminence; superior frontal gyrus; More reference expression data
BioGPS	n/a
Gene ontology
Molecular function	DNA-binding transcription factor activity; DNA binding; protein binding; identical protein binding; DNA-binding transcription factor activity, RNA polymerase II-specific
Cellular component	nucleus; mitochondrion
Biological process	response to virus; negative regulation of gene expression, epigenetic; negative regulation of transcription, DNA-templated; regulation of transcription, DNA-templated; regulation of DNA-binding transcription factor activity; transcription, DNA-templated; regulation of transcription by RNA polymerase II
Sources:Amigo / QuickGO
Orthologs
Databases	NCBI: entry; OMA: entry
Species	Human	Mouse
Entrez	58487	233490
Ensembl	ENSG00000137504	ENSMUSG00000051451
UniProt	Q9NS37	Q91ZR3
RefSeq (mRNA)	NM_001039618; NM_021212	NM_145151
RefSeq (protein)	NP_001034707	NP_660133
Location (UCSC)	Chr 11: 85.66 – 85.68 Mb	Chr 7: 90.09 – 90.1 Mb
PubMed search
- Wikidata
View/Edit Human	View/Edit Mouse

CREB/ATF bZIP transcription factor is a protein that in humans is encoded by the CREBZF gene.
