= Integrator complex subunit 5 =

Protein-coding gene in the species Homo sapiens

INTS5

Identifiers
- Aliases: INTS5, INT5, KIAA1698, integrator complex subunit 5
- External IDs: OMIM: 611349; MGI: 1923578; GeneCards: INTS5

Gene location (Human)
Chr.	Chromosome 11 (human)
Band	11q12.3	Start	62,646,848 bp
Band	11q12.3	End	62,653,302 bp

Gene location (Mouse)
Chr.	Chromosome 19 (mouse)
Band	19|19 A	Start	8,870,369 bp
Band	19|19 A	End	8,875,252 bp
RNA expression pattern
Bgee	Human / Mouse (ortholog); Top expressed in: stromal cell of endometrium; granulocyte; gastrocnemius muscle; mucosa of transverse colon; islet of Langerhans; apex of heart; right adrenal gland; skin of leg; right lobe of liver; muscle of thigh / Top expressed in: epiblast; corneal stroma; renal corpuscle; primitive streak; ventricular zone; maxillary prominence; internal carotid artery; mandibular prominence; neural tube; yolk sac; More reference expression data
BioGPS	n/a
Gene ontology
Molecular function	protein binding
Cellular component	integrator complex; integral component of membrane; membrane; nucleus; nucleoplasm; nuclear membrane; cytoplasm
Biological process	snRNA processing; snRNA transcription by RNA polymerase II
Sources:Amigo / QuickGO
Orthologs
Databases	NCBI: entry; OMA: entry
Species	Human	Mouse
Entrez	80789	109077
Ensembl	ENSG00000185085	ENSMUSG00000071652
UniProt	Q6P9B9	Q8CHT3
RefSeq (mRNA)	NM_030628	NM_176843
RefSeq (protein)	NP_085131	NP_789813
Location (UCSC)	Chr 11: 62.65 – 62.65 Mb	Chr 19: 8.87 – 8.88 Mb
PubMed search
- Wikidata
View/Edit Human	View/Edit Mouse

Integrator complex subunit 5 is a protein that in humans is encoded by the INTS5 gene.

== Function ==
The Integrator complex is a complex that associates with the C-terminal domain of RNA polymerase II large subunit. This complex is brought to U1 and U2 small nuclear RNA genes, where it is involved in the transcription and processing of their transcripts. The protein encoded by this gene represents a subunit of the Integrator complex.
