= KCTD8 =

Protein-coding gene in the species Homo sapiens

Identifiers
- Aliases: KCTD8, potassium channel tetramerization domain containing 8
- External IDs: OMIM: 618442; MGI: 2443804; GeneCards: KCTD8

Gene location (Human)
Chr.	Chromosome 4 (human)
Band	4p13	Start	44,173,903 bp
Band	4p13	End	44,448,809 bp

Gene location (Mouse)
Chr.	Chromosome 5 (mouse)
Band	5|5 C3.1	Start	69,266,628 bp
Band	5|5 C3.1	End	69,499,022 bp
RNA expression pattern
Bgee	Human / Mouse (ortholog); Top expressed in: cerebellar vermis; corpus callosum; cerebellar hemisphere; right hemisphere of cerebellum; gonad; prefrontal cortex; superior frontal gyrus; primary visual cortex; spinal cord; C1 segment / Top expressed in: habenula; lumbar spinal ganglion; inferior colliculi; cerebellar vermis; lobe of cerebellum; medial vestibular nucleus; globus pallidus; nucleus accumbens; facial motor nucleus; vestibular membrane of cochlear duct; More reference expression data
BioGPS	n/a
Orthologs
Databases	NCBI: entry; OMA: entry
Species	Human	Mouse
Entrez	386617	243043
Ensembl	ENSG00000183783	ENSMUSG00000037653
UniProt	Q6ZWB6	Q50H33
RefSeq (mRNA)	NM_198353	NM_175519
RefSeq (protein)	NP_938167	NP_780728
Location (UCSC)	Chr 4: 44.17 – 44.45 Mb	Chr 5: 69.27 – 69.5 Mb
PubMed search
- Wikidata
View/Edit Human	View/Edit Mouse

Potassium channel tetramerization domain containing 8 is a protein that in humans is encoded by the KCTD8 gene.
