= Kelch-like protein 2 =

Protein-coding gene in the species Homo sapiens

KLHL2

Identifiers
- Aliases: KLHL2, ABP-KELCH, MAV, MAYVEN, kelch like family member 2
- External IDs: OMIM: 605774; MGI: 1924363; GeneCards: KLHL2
Available structures
PDB	Ortholog search: PDBe RCSB
PDB	List of PDB id codes 2XN4, 4CHB

Gene location (Human)
Chr.	Chromosome 4 (human)
Band	4q32.3	Start	165,207,561 bp
Band	4q32.3	End	165,323,156 bp

Gene location (Mouse)
Chr.	Chromosome 8 (mouse)
Band	8|8 B3.1	Start	65,192,709 bp
Band	8|8 B3.1	End	65,302,669 bp
RNA expression pattern
Bgee	Human / Mouse (ortholog); Top expressed in: Brodmann area 23; Region I of hippocampus proper; postcentral gyrus; optic nerve; external globus pallidus; superior frontal gyrus; middle temporal gyrus; dorsal motor nucleus of vagus nerve; Brodmann area 46; orbitofrontal cortex / Top expressed in: olfactory tubercle; nucleus accumbens; dentate gyrus; subdivision of hippocampus; globus pallidus; Region I of hippocampus proper; primary motor cortex; hippocampus proper; piriform cortex; cumulus cell; More reference expression data
BioGPS	n/a
Gene ontology
Molecular function	ubiquitin-protein transferase activity; protein binding; actin binding; identical protein binding
Cellular component	ruffle; cell projection; actin cytoskeleton; lamellipodium; cytoskeleton; cytoplasm; Cul3-RING ubiquitin ligase complex; cytosol
Biological process	protein ubiquitination; post-translational protein modification
Sources:Amigo / QuickGO
Orthologs
Databases	NCBI: entry; OMA: entry
Species	Human	Mouse
Entrez	11275	77113
Ensembl	ENSG00000109466	ENSMUSG00000031605
UniProt	O95198	Q8JZP3
RefSeq (mRNA)	NM_001161521; NM_001161522; NM_007246; NM_001331023; NM_001331024	NM_178633
RefSeq (protein)	NP_001154993; NP_001154994; NP_001317952; NP_001317953; NP_009177	NP_848748
Location (UCSC)	Chr 4: 165.21 – 165.32 Mb	Chr 8: 65.19 – 65.3 Mb
PubMed search
- Wikidata
View/Edit Human	View/Edit Mouse

Kelch-like family member 2 is a protein that in humans is encoded by the KLHL2 gene.
