= DYNC1LI1 =

Protein-coding gene in the species Homo sapiens

Identifiers
- Aliases: DYNC1LI1, DNCLI1, LIC1, dynein cytoplasmic 1 light intermediate chain 1, DLC-A
- External IDs: OMIM: 615890; MGI: 2135610; GeneCards: DYNC1LI1

Gene location (Human)
| Chr. | Chromosome 3 (human) |
| Band | 3p22.3 | Start | 32,525,974 bp |
| Band | 3p22.3 | End | 32,570,858 bp |

Gene location (Mouse)
| Chr. | Chromosome 9 (mouse) |
| Band | 9|9 F3 | Start | 114,517,858 bp |
| Band | 9|9 F3 | End | 114,553,370 bp |
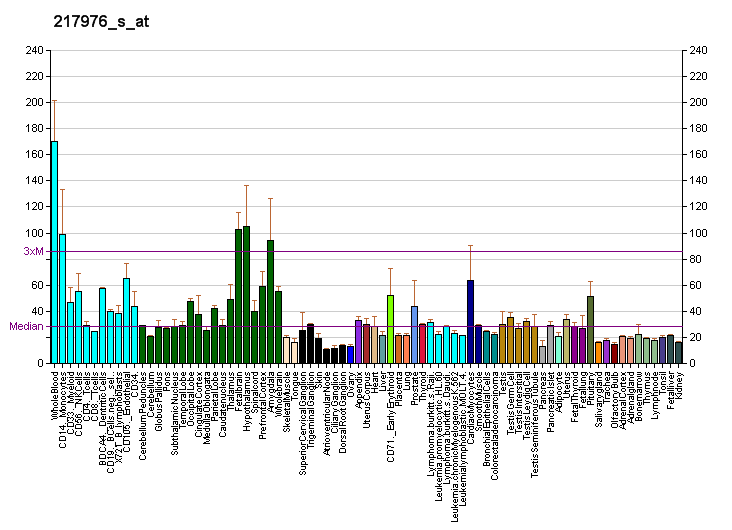
RNA expression pattern
| Bgee | Human / Mouse (ortholog); Top expressed in: monocyte; right ventricle; ganglionic eminence; gonad; lateral nuclear group of thalamus; pons; testicle; gastrocnemius muscle; ventricular zone; biceps brachii / Top expressed in: neural layer of retina; granulocyte; interventricular septum; gastrula; primary visual cortex; right kidney; muscle of thigh; superior frontal gyrus; ankle; decidua; More reference expression data |
| BioGPS | More reference expression data |
Gene ontology
| Molecular function | microtubule motor activity; nucleotide binding; GDP binding; dynein heavy chain binding; GTP binding; protein binding; cytoskeletal motor activity; ATP binding; RNA binding |
| Cellular component | centrosome; spindle pole; membrane; chromosome; cytoplasmic dynein complex; dynein complex; microtubule; chromosome, centromeric region; cytoskeleton; kinetochore; cytoplasm; cytosol; plasma membrane; secretory granule membrane; ficolin-1-rich granule membrane |
| Biological process | positive regulation of mitotic cell cycle spindle assembly checkpoint; cell division; cell cycle; viral process; microtubule cytoskeleton organization; endoplasmic reticulum to Golgi vesicle-mediated transport; microtubule-based movement; antigen processing and presentation of exogenous peptide antigen via MHC class II; neutrophil degranulation; sister chromatid cohesion; transport |
Sources:Amigo / QuickGO
Orthologs
| Databases | NCBI: entry; OMA: entry |
| Species | Human | Mouse |
| Entrez | 51143 | 235661 |
| Ensembl | ENSG00000144635 | ENSMUSG00000032435 |
| UniProt | Q9Y6G9 | Q8R1Q8 |
| RefSeq (mRNA) | NM_016141; NM_001329135 | NM_146229 |
| RefSeq (protein) | NP_001316064; NP_057225 | NP_666341 |
| Location (UCSC) | Chr 3: 32.53 – 32.57 Mb | Chr 9: 114.52 – 114.55 Mb |
| PubMed search |
- Wikidata
| View/Edit Human | View/Edit Mouse |

Cytoplasmic dynein 1 light intermediate chain 1 is a protein that in humans is encoded by the DYNC1LI1 gene.
