= ZDHHC4 =

Protein-coding gene in the species Homo sapiens

Identifiers
- Aliases: ZDHHC4, ZNF374, zinc finger DHHC-type containing 4
- External IDs: MGI: 1920131; GeneCards: ZDHHC4
Enzyme activity
EC #	BRENDA	ExPASy	KEGG	MetaCyc
2.3.1.225	↗	↗	↗	↗

Gene location (Human)
Chr.	Chromosome 7 (human)
Band	7p22.1	Start	6,577,434 bp
Band	7p22.1	End	6,589,374 bp

Gene location (Mouse)
Chr.	Chromosome 5 (mouse)
Band	5|5 G2	Start	143,316,489 bp
Band	5|5 G2	End	143,329,256 bp
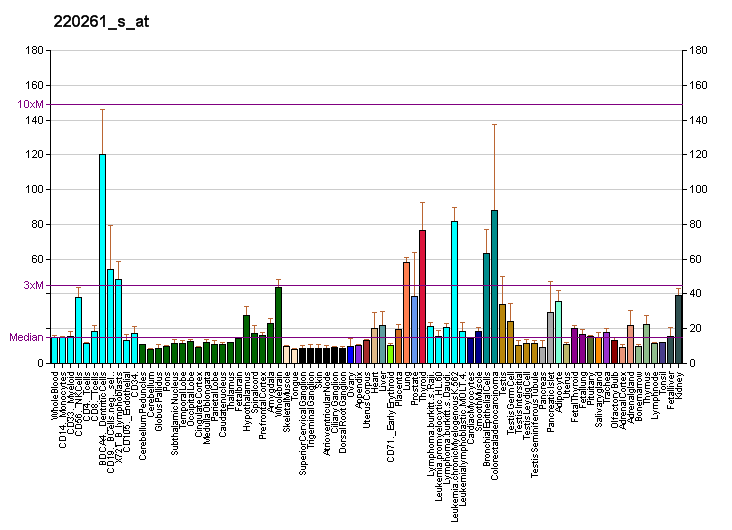
RNA expression pattern
Bgee	Human / Mouse (ortholog); Top expressed in: left testis; right testis; islet of Langerhans; body of pancreas; stromal cell of endometrium; muscle layer of sigmoid colon; gastric mucosa; gastrocnemius muscle; body of stomach; right adrenal cortex / Top expressed in: spermatocyte; spermatid; seminiferous tubule; right kidney; interventricular septum; lip; muscle of thigh; granulocyte; otic vesicle; saccule; More reference expression data
BioGPS	More reference expression data
Gene ontology
Molecular function	acyltransferase activity; protein-cysteine S-palmitoyltransferase activity; transferase activity
Cellular component	Golgi apparatus; membrane; integral component of membrane; endoplasmic reticulum; endoplasmic reticulum membrane
Biological process	protein targeting to membrane; peptidyl-L-cysteine S-palmitoylation
Sources:Amigo / QuickGO
Orthologs
Databases	NCBI: entry; OMA: entry
Species	Human	Mouse
Entrez	55146	72881
Ensembl	ENSG00000136247	ENSMUSG00000001844
UniProt	Q9NPG8	Q9D6H5
RefSeq (mRNA)	NM_001134387; NM_001134388; NM_001134389; NM_018106	NM_028379; NM_001359445
RefSeq (protein)	NP_001127859; NP_001127860; NP_001127861; NP_060576; NP_001358221 NP_001358222; NP_001358223; NP_001358224; NP_001358225; NP_001358226; NP_001358227; NP_001358228	NP_082655; NP_001346374
Location (UCSC)	Chr 7: 6.58 – 6.59 Mb	Chr 5: 143.32 – 143.33 Mb
PubMed search
- Wikidata
View/Edit Human	View/Edit Mouse

Probable palmitoyltransferase ZDHHC4 is an enzyme that in humans is encoded by the ZDHHC4 gene.

== See also ==
- Chromosome 7 (human)
- Cytochrome c oxidase
- DHHC domain
