= ZDHHC8 =

Protein-coding gene in the species Homo sapiens

Identifiers
- Aliases: ZDHHC8, DHHC8, ZDHHCL1, ZNF378, zinc finger DHHC-type containing 8, zinc finger DHHC-type palmitoyltransferase 8
- External IDs: OMIM: 608784; MGI: 1338012; GeneCards: ZDHHC8
Enzyme activity
EC #	BRENDA	ExPASy	KEGG	MetaCyc
2.3.1.225	↗	↗	↗	↗

Gene location (Human)
Chr.	Chromosome 22 (human)
Band	22q11.21	Start	20,129,456 bp
Band	22q11.21	End	20,148,007 bp
RNA expression pattern
Bgee	Human / Mouse (ortholog); Top expressed in: tibial nerve; right hemisphere of cerebellum; stromal cell of endometrium; anterior pituitary; right ovary; apex of heart; right lobe of thyroid gland; left lobe of thyroid gland; granulocyte; right frontal lobe / n/a; More reference expression data
BioGPS	n/a
Gene ontology
Molecular function	palmitoyltransferase activity; transferase activity; acyltransferase activity; protein-cysteine S-palmitoyltransferase activity
Cellular component	integral component of membrane; Golgi apparatus; cytoplasmic vesicle membrane; mitochondrion; membrane; cytoplasmic vesicle; cytosol
Biological process	protein palmitoylation; locomotory behavior; high-density lipoprotein particle assembly
Sources:Amigo / QuickGO
Orthologs
Databases	NCBI: entry; OMA: entry
Species	Human	Mouse
Entrez	29801	27801
Ensembl	ENSG00000099904	ENSMUSG00000060166
UniProt	Q9ULC8	Q5Y5T5
RefSeq (mRNA)	NM_001185024; NM_013373	NM_172151
RefSeq (protein)	NP_001171953; NP_037505	NP_742163; NP_001365948
Location (UCSC)	Chr 22: 20.13 – 20.15 Mb	n/a
PubMed search
- Wikidata
View/Edit Human	View/Edit Mouse

ZDHHC8 is a putative palmitoyltransferase enzyme containing a DHHC domain that in humans is encoded by the ZDHHC8 gene.
