= ZDHHC2 =

Protein-coding gene in the species Homo sapiens

Identifiers
- Aliases: ZDHHC2, DHHC2, ZNF372, zinc finger DHHC-type containing 2, zinc finger DHHC-type palmitoyltransferase 2
- External IDs: MGI: 1923452; GeneCards: ZDHHC2
Enzyme activity
EC #	BRENDA	ExPASy	KEGG	MetaCyc
2.3.1.225	↗	↗	↗	↗

Gene location (Human)
Chr.	Chromosome 8 (human)
Band	8p22	Start	17,156,482 bp
Band	8p22	End	17,224,799 bp

Gene location (Mouse)
Chr.	Chromosome 8 (mouse)
Band	8|8 A4	Start	40,876,856 bp
Band	8|8 A4	End	40,963,309 bp
RNA expression pattern
Bgee	Human / Mouse (ortholog); Top expressed in: sperm; retinal pigment epithelium; pancreatic epithelial cell; tibialis anterior muscle; mucosa of ileum; Skeletal muscle tissue of rectus abdominis; biceps brachii; spinal ganglia; renal medulla; deltoid muscle / Top expressed in: cranial nervi; trigeminal nerve; islet of Langerhans; barrel cortex; lumbar spinal ganglion; autonomic nerve plexus; parasympathetic nervous system; ventromedial nucleus; retinal pigment epithelium; trigeminal ganglion; More reference expression data
BioGPS	n/a
Gene ontology
Molecular function	protein-cysteine S-palmitoyltransferase activity; transferase activity; acyltransferase activity; palmitoyltransferase activity
Cellular component	integral component of membrane; plasma membrane; Golgi apparatus; recycling endosome membrane; integral component of plasma membrane; endoplasmic reticulum; membrane
Biological process	protein palmitoylation; protein targeting to membrane; peptidyl-L-cysteine S-palmitoylation
Sources:Amigo / QuickGO
Orthologs
Databases	NCBI: entry; OMA: entry
Species	Human	Mouse
Entrez	51201	70546
Ensembl	ENSG00000104219	ENSMUSG00000039470
UniProt	Q9UIJ5	P59267
RefSeq (mRNA)	NM_016353; NM_001362988; NM_001362989	NM_178395; NM_001357249
RefSeq (protein)	NP_057437; NP_001349917; NP_001349918	NP_848482; NP_001344178
Location (UCSC)	Chr 8: 17.16 – 17.22 Mb	Chr 8: 40.88 – 40.96 Mb
PubMed search
- Wikidata
View/Edit Human	View/Edit Mouse

Zinc finger, also known as ZDHHC2, is a human gene.
