= RBM4 =

Protein-coding gene in the species Homo sapiens

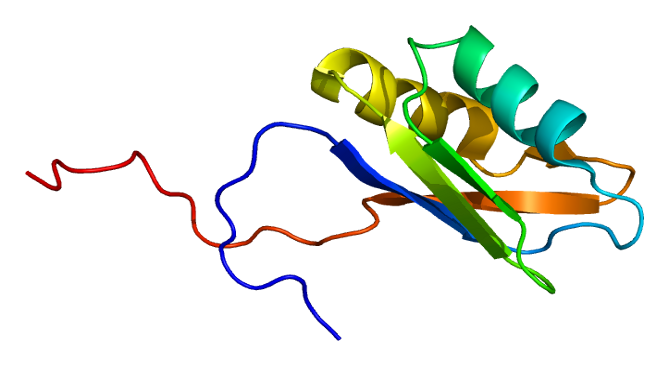

Identifiers
- Aliases: RBM4, LARK, RBM4A, ZCCHC21, ZCRB3A, RNA binding motif protein 4
- External IDs: OMIM: 602571; MGI: 1100865; GeneCards: RBM4
Available structures
| PDB | Ortholog search: PDBe RCSB |
| PDB | List of PDB id codes 2DNQ |

Gene location (Human)
| Chr. | Chromosome 11 (human) |
| Band | 11q13.2 | Start | 66,638,667 bp |
| Band | 11q13.2 | End | 66,668,374 bp |

Gene location (Mouse)
| Chr. | Chromosome 19 (mouse) |
| Band | 19|19 A | Start | 4,834,321 bp |
| Band | 19|19 A | End | 4,843,929 bp |
RNA expression pattern
| Bgee | Human / Mouse (ortholog); Top expressed in: ganglionic eminence; ventricular zone; body of pancreas; right hemisphere of cerebellum; right adrenal gland; left ovary; right ovary; right adrenal cortex; right lobe of thyroid gland; left adrenal gland / Top expressed in: ventricular zone; right kidney; neural layer of retina; yolk sac; dentate gyrus of hippocampal formation granule cell; neural tube; lip; granulocyte; ganglionic eminence; tail of embryo; More reference expression data |
| BioGPS | n/a |
Gene ontology
| Molecular function | pre-mRNA intronic pyrimidine-rich binding; pre-mRNA intronic binding; miRNA binding; zinc ion binding; metal ion binding; mRNA 3'-UTR binding; protein binding; RNA binding; nucleic acid binding; mRNA binding; cyclin binding |
| Cellular component | cytoplasm; nuclear speck; nucleoplasm; nucleolus; cytoplasmic stress granule; nucleus; cytosol |
| Biological process | cell differentiation; regulation of nucleocytoplasmic transport; RNA processing; negative regulation of translation; negative regulation of translation in response to stress; negative regulation of translational initiation; positive regulation of muscle cell differentiation; mRNA processing; response to arsenic-containing substance; regulation of alternative mRNA splicing, via spliceosome; cap-independent translational initiation; circadian regulation of translation; miRNA-mediated gene silencing by inhibition of translation; IRES-dependent translational initiation of linear mRNA; RNA splicing; gene silencing; entrainment of circadian clock by photoperiod; mRNA cis splicing, via spliceosome |
Sources:Amigo / QuickGO
Orthologs
| Databases | NCBI: entry; OMA: entry |
| Species | Human | Mouse |
| Entrez | 5936 | 19653 |
| Ensembl | ENSG00000173933 | ENSMUSG00000094936 |
| UniProt | Q9BWF3 | Q8C7Q4 |
| RefSeq (mRNA) | NM_002896; NM_001198843; NM_001198844 | NM_001290122; NM_001290123; NM_001290124; NM_001290125; NM_009032 |
| RefSeq (protein) | NP_001185772; NP_001185773; NP_002887 | NP_001277051; NP_001277052; NP_001277053; NP_001277054; NP_033058 |
| Location (UCSC) | Chr 11: 66.64 – 66.67 Mb | Chr 19: 4.83 – 4.84 Mb |
| PubMed search |
- Wikidata
| View/Edit Human | View/Edit Mouse |

RNA-binding protein 4 is a protein that in humans is encoded by the RBM4 gene.

RBM4 is a protein categorized as an RNA recognition motif (RRM). RRM proteins represent a substantial and functionally varied category of RNA-binding proteins, participating in various functions such as RNA processing and transport, the control of RNA stability, and translational regulation. The RBM4 protein also can be recognized as Lark. Over the past five years, data has emerged from investigations involving mammalian cells, providing a clearer understanding of RBM4's functions. It is now evident that RBM4 serves as an RNA-binding protein, participating in a wide array of cellular processes, which encompass the alternative splicing of pre-mRNA, translation control, and RNA silencing. Structurally, RBM4 shares similarities with other RNA-binding proteins, featuring two RNA recognition motifs and a CCHC-type zinc finger. Notably, RBM4 demonstrates a high degree of conservation throughout the process of evolution. In the context of the human RBM4 gene, it shares an impressive 95% similarity with its murine counterpart.

== Structure ==
Within the realm of mammals, the two distinct isoforms of RBM4 are RBM4a and RBM4b. These two isoforms exhibit remarkably similar sequences, and their existence is believed to have arisen through gene duplication. In humans, both are located on chromosome 11q13, and in mouse are on chromosome 19A. The deletion of both RNA recognition motifs results in anomalous subnuclear localization, indicating that having at least one RRM is essential for directing RBM4 to specific nuclear subcompartments. Also, it appears that RBM4A is not vital for the targeting of RBM4 to the nucleolus. Furthermore, a mutation in RBM4B led to irregular nucleolar expression, extending to its periphery. These observations align with findings from studies on Drosophila Lark, where it was shown that RRM1 is dispensable for embryonic development. In contrast, a double mutation affecting both RNA binding domains is lethal, and a mutation in RRM2 leads to female infertility or developmental arrest in offspring. These two RNA recognition motifs are located at the N-terminus, followed by the CCHC-type zinc finger.

However, the C-terminal region of RBM4 proteins displays less conservation among species. In mammalian RBM4 proteins, there are several stretches rich in alanine, while Drosophila Lark contains sequences that are rich in proline and numerous arginine/serine dipeptides. Previous research has demonstrated the pivotal role of the C-terminal domain of human RBM4 in facilitating its nuclear entry and localization within nuclear speckles enriched with splicing factors. Additionally, this C-terminal region contributes significantly to RBM4's involvement in controlling alternative splicing.

== Function ==
It was initially discovered for its involvement in regulating the circadian rhythm in Drosophila. RBM4 abundance undergoes circadian fluctuations in extracts derived from pharate adults. Additionally, RBM4 is identifiable within neurons that harbor the modulatory neuropeptide crustacean cardioactive peptide (CCAP), playing a crucial role in the regulation of ecdysis in Drosophila and other insects. In CCAP cells, RBM4 exhibits a distinct cytoplasmic localization (as opposed to its nuclear localization in other neurons), and there are striking circadian variations in RBM4 immunoreactivity within this specific neuronal population. Also, RBM4 exhibits widespread expression throughout embryogenesis, with detectable mRNA present in both the developing nervous system and nonneural tissues. Normal embryogenesis necessitates the expression of both maternal and zygotic RBM4. Zygotic RBM4 deficiency halts development around the time of germ band retraction, while embryos lacking maternally inherited RBM4 mRNA experience developmental arrest in early embryogenesis. The retroviral-type zinc finger is crucial for the maternal developmental function, as evidenced by the fact that females with a mutation in this domain can survive and mate, but their zygotes undergo developmental arrest in the early stages of embryogenesis.

RBM4 exhibits dynamic movement between the nucleus and cytoplasm, and this nucleocytoplasmic transport and subcellular positioning are likely under the regulation of cellular signaling pathways. RBM4 undergoes phosphorylation in response to cellular stress conditions and during the initiation of muscle cell differentiation. Phosphorylated RBM4 tends to accumulate in the cytoplasm and can be found in cytoplasmic stress granules as well as granules containing microRNPs (miRNPs). The MKK/p38 kinase pathway is responsible for the stress-induced phosphorylation of RBM4 and its subsequent accumulation in the cytoplasm. Under normal circumstances, RBM4 inhibits Cap-dependent translation. However, when exposed to a stress stimulus, it activates internal ribosome entry site (IRES)-mediated translation, potentially by enhancing the stability of eIF4A-containing initiation complexes. This IRES-mediated translation process facilitates the expression of stress-response genes, suggesting that RBM4 may serve as a translational regulator for stress-associated mRNAs. The role of RBM4 in translation was substantiated by demonstrating its direct binding to the 3'-UTR of Period1 (Per1), a significant circadian clock gene. Murine RBM4 exerted control over the expression of mPER1 in a Cap/poly(A)-dependent manner.

RBM4 can influence alternative 5′-splice site and exon selection in in-vivo and in-vitro splicing models. By either including or skipping alternative exons, RBM4 demonstrates the dual capacity to function as an activator and a repressor. Notably, RBM4 binds to intronic CU-rich elements in a skeletal muscle-specific isoform of α-tropomyosin, underscoring its interaction with pre-mRNA. Furthermore, RBM4 regulates this isoform in a manner that opposes the actions of polypyrimidine tract binding (PTB) protein, another RNA-binding protein involved in various RNA processing aspects. The competition for binding to the same cis-element is likely between RBM4 and PTB. The binding of RBM4 to intronic elements was corroborated by its interaction with a pyrimidine-rich sequence downstream of the 5′-splice site of exon 10 of tau.

== Clinical relevance ==
=== Pancreas cell signaling circuit ===
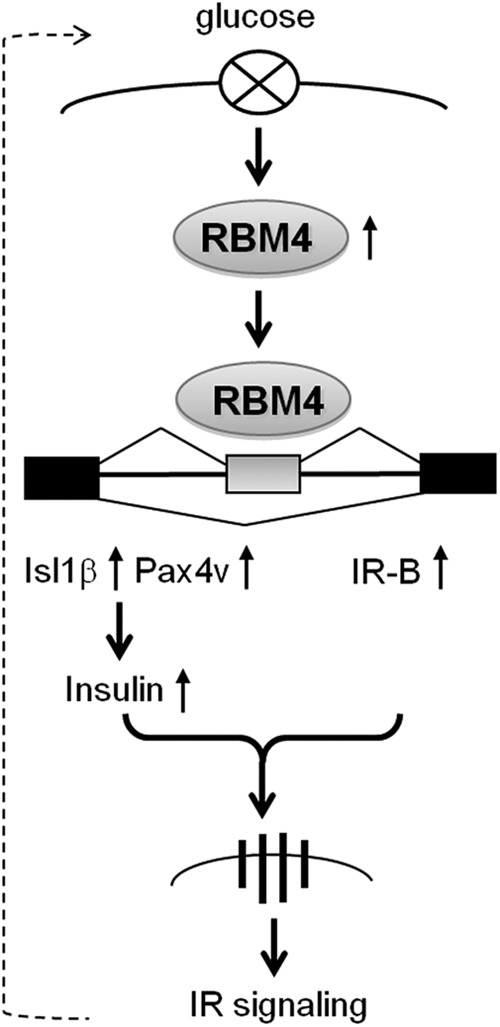
Fig.1 Framework for a gene expression and signaling circuit in the pancreas regulated by RBM4. Source: National Library of Medicine

RBM4 plays a role in modulating the inclusion of exon 11 in IR, promoting the expression of the IR-B isoform across various cell lines and tissues. RBM4 functions as a positive regulator in glucose signaling pathways, with its over expression mimicking the effects of glucose induction on insulin and IR-B isoform expression. The prevalence of the IR-B isoform in differentiated pancreatic β cells, exhibiting heightened sensitivity to insulin, is noteworthy. The activation of p38 MAPK signaling by IR-B is crucial for pancreatic development and insulin production in β cells. Additionally, insulin activates the phosphatidylinositol-3-kinase–Akt pathway, supporting β-islet survival and function. Consequently, elevated levels of insulin and IR-B may amplify the signaling pathways of p38 MAPK and Akt. Intriguingly, our findings indicate that RBM4 is responsible for signal-activated p38 MAPK and Akt signaling when cells are exposed to glucose. It is plausible that the increased expression of RBM4 induced by glucose facilitates a more effective transmission of insulin and/or IR signaling, leading to enhanced glucose uptake. Figure 1 displays the framework for a gene expression and signaling circuit in the pancreas regulated by RBM4. RBM4 influences alternative splicing of various pancreatic factors, such as Isl1, Pax4, and IR. The isoforms of Isl1 and Pax4 induced by RBM4 have the potential to enhance insulin gene transcription. Additionally, the IR-B isoform induced by RBM4 likely demonstrates increased signaling activity upon insulin binding, leading to elevated glucose uptake and signaling (represented by the dashed line).

=== Disease relevance ===
RBM4 engages in interactions with cyclin A1 and undergoes phosphorylation by cyclin A1–CDK2. The levels of RBM4 and cyclin A1 exhibit a correlation in normal testis, testes with diminished fertility, and in testicular tumors. Cyclin A1 displays tissue-specific expression, particularly high in the testis, where it plays a crucial role in spermatogenesis. Additionally, its presence is noted in specific myeloid leukemias. WT1, known for binding to RBM4, is essential for proper gonadal development and spermatogenesis, and is frequently over expressed in acute myeloid leukemia. Furthermore, reports indicate an up-regulation of RBM4 in apoptotic K562 cells, a human leukemia cell line. In has been see that a decreased amount of RBM4 in the fetal brain results in Down's Syndrome. Considering the expression pattern of RBM4 in the brain and its capability to impact tau splicing, it is plausible that RBM4 may play a role in tauopathies, which encompass a cluster of neurodegenerative disorders, including dementia.
