= Janus kinase and microtubule-interacting protein 1 =

Protein in homo sapiens

JAKMIP1

Identifiers
- Aliases: JAKMIP1, Gababrbp, JAMIP1, MARLIN1, janus kinase and microtubule interacting protein 1
- External IDs: OMIM: 611195; MGI: 1923321; HomoloGene: 90789; GeneCards: JAKMIP1; OMA:JAKMIP1 - orthologs

Gene location (Human)
| Chr. | Chromosome 4 (human) |
| Band | 4p16.1 | Start | 6,026,199 bp |
| Band | 4p16.1 | End | 6,200,591 bp |

Gene location (Mouse)
| Chr. | Chromosome 5 (mouse) |
| Band | 5|5 B3 | Start | 37,185,679 bp |
| Band | 5|5 B3 | End | 37,307,951 bp |
RNA expression pattern
| Bgee | Human / Mouse (ortholog); Top expressed in: caudate nucleus; nucleus accumbens; putamen; middle temporal gyrus; prefrontal cortex; Brodmann area 23; dorsolateral prefrontal cortex; superior frontal gyrus; entorhinal cortex; Brodmann area 9 / Top expressed in: olfactory epithelium; facial motor nucleus; Paneth cell; Region I of hippocampus proper; substantia nigra; trigeminal ganglion; dentate gyrus of hippocampal formation granule cell; thymus; nucleus of stria terminalis; dorsal striatum; More reference expression data |
| BioGPS | n/a |
Gene ontology
| Molecular function | microtubule binding; kinase binding; protein binding; kinesin binding; RNA binding; GABA receptor binding; mRNA binding; translation regulator activity |
| Cellular component | cytoplasm; microtubule cytoskeleton; microtubule; cytoskeleton; membrane; extrinsic component of membrane; ribonucleoprotein complex; ribonucleoprotein granule |
| Biological process | protein transport; cognition; striatum development; positive regulation of developmental process; positive regulation of cytoplasmic translation |
Sources:Amigo / QuickGO
Orthologs
| Species | Human | Mouse |
| Entrez | 152789 | 76071 |
| Ensembl | ENSG00000152969 | ENSMUSG00000063646 |
| UniProt | Q96N16 | Q8BVL9 |
| RefSeq (mRNA) | NM_001099433; NM_001306133; NM_001306134; NM_144720 | NM_178394; NM_001347348; NM_001401053; NM_001401054; NM_001401055 NM_001401056 |
| RefSeq (protein) | NP_001092903; NP_001293062; NP_001293063; NP_653321 | NP_001334277; NP_848481; NP_001387982; NP_001387983; NP_001387984 NP_001387985 |
| Location (UCSC) | Chr 4: 6.03 – 6.2 Mb | Chr 5: 37.19 – 37.31 Mb |
| PubMed search |
- Wikidata
| View/Edit Human | View/Edit Mouse |

Janus kinase and microtubule-interacting protein 1 is a protein in humans encoded by the JAKMIP1 gene.
