= IQCN =

Protein-coding gene in the species Homo sapiens

Identifiers
- Aliases: IQCN, IQ motif containing N, KIAA1683
- External IDs: GeneCards: IQCN

Gene location (Human)
Chr.	Chromosome 19 (human)
Band	19p13.11	Start	18,257,098 bp
Band	19p13.11	End	18,274,500 bp
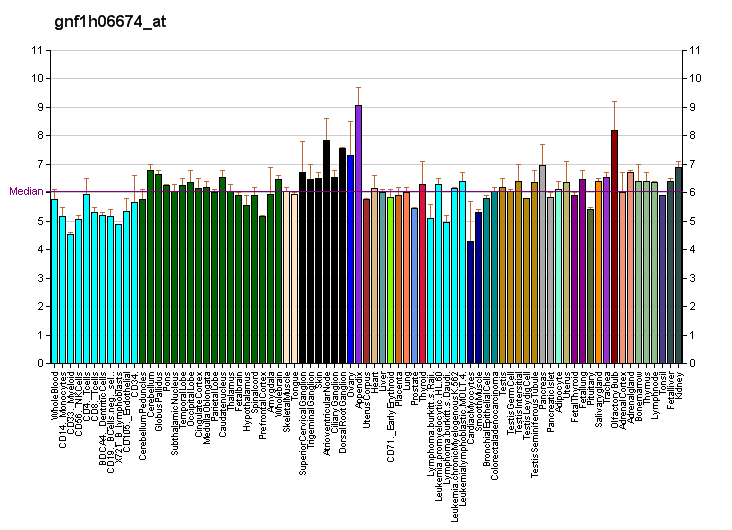
RNA expression pattern
Bgee	Human / Mouse (ortholog); Top expressed in: sural nerve; left testis; right testis; right uterine tube; left uterine tube; testicle; gastric mucosa; bone marrow cell; right ovary; left ovary / n/a; More reference expression data
BioGPS	More reference expression data
Orthologs
Databases	NCBI: entry; OMA: entry
Species	Human	Mouse
Entrez	80726	n/a
Ensembl	ENSG00000130518	n/a
UniProt	Q9H0B3	n/a
RefSeq (mRNA)	NM_001145304; NM_001145305; NM_025249	n/a
RefSeq (protein)	NP_001138776; NP_001138777; NP_079525	n/a
Location (UCSC)	Chr 19: 18.26 – 18.27 Mb	n/a
PubMed search		n/a
- Wikidata
View/Edit Human

IQ domain-containing protein N is a protein that in humans is encoded by the IQCN gene (previously KIAA1683). This protein is involved in sperm cell development.
