= LAPTM4A =

Protein-coding gene in the species Homo sapiens

Identifiers
- Aliases: LAPTM4A, HUMORF13, LAPTM4, MBNT, Mtrp, lysosomal protein transmembrane 4 alpha
- External IDs: MGI: 108017; HomoloGene: 7427; GeneCards: LAPTM4A; OMA:LAPTM4A - orthologs

Gene location (Human)
Chr.	Chromosome 2 (human)
Band	2p24.1	Start	20,032,650 bp
Band	2p24.1	End	20,051,628 bp

Gene location (Mouse)
Chr.	Chromosome 12 (mouse)
Band	12|12 A1.1	Start	8,971,664 bp
Band	12|12 A1.1	End	8,988,742 bp
RNA expression pattern
Bgee	Human / Mouse (ortholog); Top expressed in: seminal vesicula; skin of hip; germinal epithelium; synovial joint; urethra; caput epididymis; Epithelium of choroid plexus; mucosa of paranasal sinus; tail of epididymis; superficial temporal artery / Top expressed in: corneal stroma; calvaria; choroid plexus of fourth ventricle; molar; seminal vesicula; extensor digitorum longus muscle; extraocular muscle; right lung; lactiferous gland; umbilical cord; More reference expression data
BioGPS	n/a
Gene ontology
Molecular function	protein binding
Cellular component	endomembrane system; integral component of membrane; Golgi apparatus; membrane; lysosomal membrane; late endosome membrane
Biological process	transport
Sources:Amigo / QuickGO
Orthologs
Species	Human	Mouse
Entrez	9741	17775
Ensembl	ENSG00000068697	ENSMUSG00000020585
UniProt	Q15012	Q60961
RefSeq (mRNA)	NM_014713	NM_008640
RefSeq (protein)	NP_055528	n/a
Location (UCSC)	Chr 2: 20.03 – 20.05 Mb	Chr 12: 8.97 – 8.99 Mb
PubMed search
- Wikidata
View/Edit Human	View/Edit Mouse

Lysosomal protein transmembrane 4 alpha is a protein that in humans is encoded by the LAPTM4A gene.

== Function ==
This gene encodes a protein that has four predicted transmembrane domains. The function of this gene has not yet been determined; however, studies in the mouse homolog suggest a role in the transport of small molecules across endosomal and lysosomal membranes.
