= Hemicentin 2 =

Protein-coding gene in the species Homo sapiens

HMCN2

Identifiers
- Aliases: HMCN2, hemicentin 2
- External IDs: MGI: 2677838; GeneCards: HMCN2

Gene location (Human)
Chr.	Chromosome 9 (human)
Band	9q34.11	Start	130,265,760 bp
Band	9q34.11	End	130,434,123 bp

Gene location (Mouse)
Chr.	Chromosome 2 (mouse)
Band	2|2 B	Start	31,204,427 bp
Band	2|2 B	End	31,350,750 bp
RNA expression pattern
Bgee	Human / Mouse (ortholog); Top expressed in: muscle layer of sigmoid colon; saphenous vein; apex of heart; body of uterus; muscle of thigh; transverse colon; mucosa of transverse colon; ectocervix; canal of the cervix; gastrocnemius muscle / Top expressed in: esophagus; skeletal muscle tissue; duodenum; ileum; quadriceps femoris muscle; muscle of thigh; urinary bladder; colon; jejunum; midgut; More reference expression data
BioGPS	n/a
Gene ontology
Molecular function	calcium ion binding; extracellular matrix structural constituent
Cellular component	extracellular region; cell cortex; basement membrane; cell junction; cleavage furrow; extracellular matrix; extracellular space; collagen-containing extracellular matrix
Biological process	response to stimulus; smooth muscle contraction; positive regulation of cell migration
Sources:Amigo / QuickGO
Orthologs
Databases	NCBI: entry; OMA: entry
Species	Human	Mouse
Entrez	256158	665700
Ensembl	ENSG00000148357	ENSMUSG00000055632
UniProt	Q8NDA2	n/a
RefSeq (mRNA)	NM_001291815; NM_144655	NM_177649; NM_001370902
RefSeq (protein)	n/a	n/a
Location (UCSC)	Chr 9: 130.27 – 130.43 Mb	Chr 2: 31.2 – 31.35 Mb
PubMed search
- Wikidata
View/Edit Human	View/Edit Mouse

Hemicentin 2 is a protein that in humans is encoded by the HMCN2 gene.
