= HIST2H3PS2 =

Pseudogene in humans

H3-7

Identifiers
- Aliases: H3-7, p06, histone cluster 2, H3, pseudogene 2, histone cluster 2 H3 pseudogene 2, HIST2H3PS2, H3.2 histone (putative), H3.7, H3-2, H3.7 histone (putative)
- External IDs: GeneCards: H3-7

Gene location (Human)
Chr.	Chromosome 1 (human)
Band	1q21.1	Start	143,894,544 bp
Band	1q21.1	End	143,905,977 bp
RNA expression pattern
Bgee	Human / Mouse (ortholog); Top expressed in: left ovary; right adrenal gland; right ovary; right adrenal cortex; left adrenal gland; left adrenal cortex; body of stomach; cerebellar hemisphere; right hemisphere of cerebellum; buccal mucosa cell / n/a; More reference expression data
BioGPS	n/a
Orthologs
Databases	NCBI: entry; OMA: entry
Species	Human	Mouse
Entrez	440686	n/a
Ensembl	ENSG00000273213	n/a
UniProt	n a	n/a
RefSeq (mRNA)	NM_001025303; NM_001355409; NM_001372105	n/a
RefSeq (protein)	n/a	n/a
Location (UCSC)	Chr 1: 143.89 – 143.91 Mb	n/a
PubMed search		n/a
- Wikidata
View/Edit Human

Histone cluster 2, H3, pseudogene 2, also known as HIST2H3PS2, is a human gene.
