= HIST1H2BO =

Protein-coding gene in the species Homo sapiens

H2BC17

Identifiers
- Aliases: H2BC17, H2B.2, H2B/n, H2BFN, dJ193B12.2, histone cluster 1, H2bo, histone cluster 1 H2B family member o, HIST1H2BO, H2B clustered histone 17
- External IDs: OMIM: 602808; MGI: 2448409; GeneCards: H2BC17

Gene location (Human)
Chr.	Chromosome 6 (human)
Band	6p22.1	Start	27,893,425 bp
Band	6p22.1	End	27,893,891 bp

Gene location (Mouse)
Chr.	Chromosome 13 (mouse)
Band	13|13 A3.1	Start	21,971,631 bp
Band	13|13 A3.1	End	21,973,383 bp
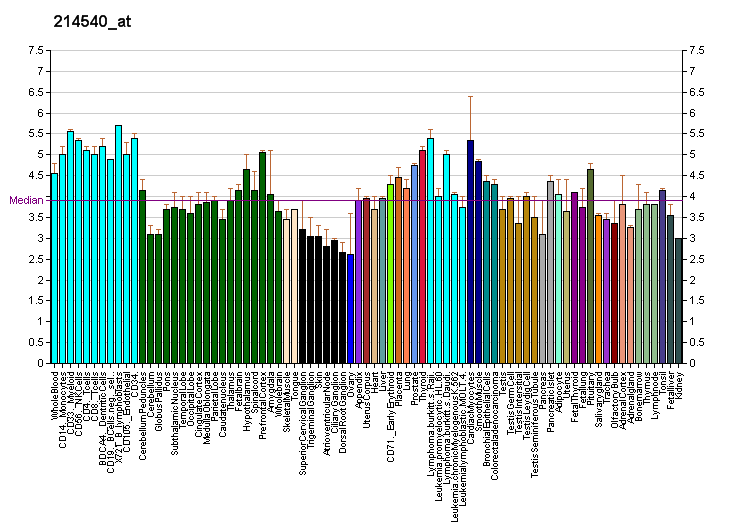
RNA expression pattern
Bgee	Human / Mouse (ortholog); Top expressed in: bone marrow cell; monocyte; gonad; granulocyte; epithelium of colon; Achilles tendon; ventricular zone; blood; tonsil; mucosa of transverse colon / Top expressed in: spermatid; uterus; spermatocyte; testicle; genital tubercle; embryo; ileum; bone marrow; embryo; quadriceps femoris muscle; More reference expression data
BioGPS	More reference expression data
Gene ontology
Molecular function	DNA binding; protein heterodimerization activity
Cellular component	chromosome; nucleosome; nucleus; nucleoplasm; cytosol
Biological process	nucleosome assembly; protein ubiquitination
Sources:Amigo / QuickGO
Orthologs
Databases	NCBI: entry; OMA: entry
Species	Human	Mouse
Entrez	8348	319188
Ensembl	ENSG00000274641	ENSMUSG00000069308
UniProt	P23527	Q8CGP2
RefSeq (mRNA)	NM_003527	NM_001290466; NM_178202
RefSeq (protein)	NP_003518	NP_001277395; NP_835509
Location (UCSC)	Chr 6: 27.89 – 27.89 Mb	Chr 13: 21.97 – 21.97 Mb
PubMed search
- Wikidata
View/Edit Human	View/Edit Mouse

Histone H2B type 1-O is a protein that in humans is encoded by the HIST1H2BO gene.

Histones are basic nuclear proteins that are responsible for the nucleosome structure of the chromosomal fiber in eukaryotes. Two molecules of each of the four core histones (H2A, H2B, H3, and H4) form an octamer, around which approximately 146 bp of DNA is wrapped in repeating units, called nucleosomes.

The linker histone, H1, interacts with linker DNA between nucleosomes and functions in the compaction of chromatin into higher order structures. This gene is intronless and encodes a member of the histone H2B family. Transcripts from this gene lack polyA tails but instead contain a palindromic termination element. This gene is found in the small histone gene cluster on chromosome 6p22-p21.3.
