= HIST3H2BB =

Protein-coding gene in humans

H2BU1

Identifiers
- Aliases: H2BU1, H2Bb, histone cluster 3, H2bb, histone cluster 3 H2B family member b, H2B.U histone 1, HIST3H2BB
- External IDs: OMIM: 615046; MGI: 1922442; GeneCards: H2BU1

Gene location (Human)
Chr.	Chromosome 1 (human)
Band	1q42.13	Start	228,458,103 bp
Band	1q42.13	End	228,463,104 bp

Gene location (Mouse)
Chr.	Chromosome 11 (mouse)
Band	11|11 B1.3	Start	58,844,874 bp
Band	11|11 B1.3	End	58,845,254 bp
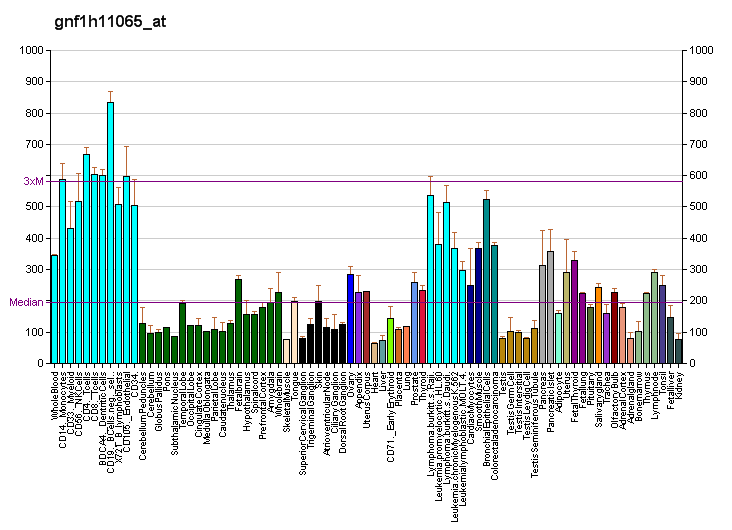

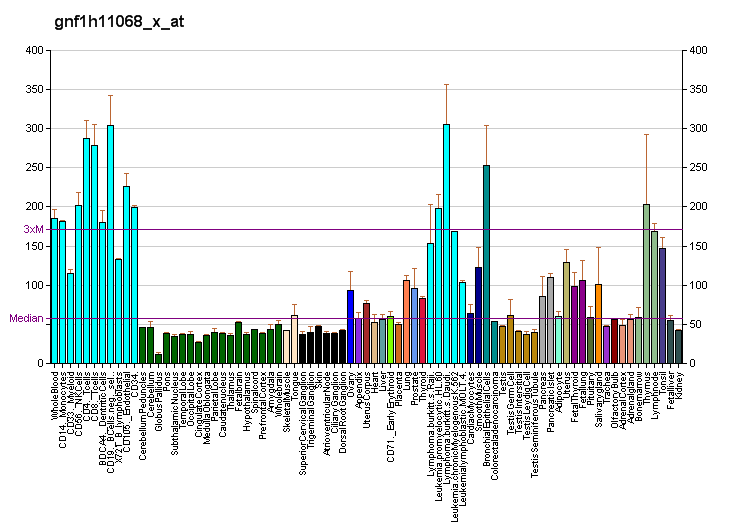

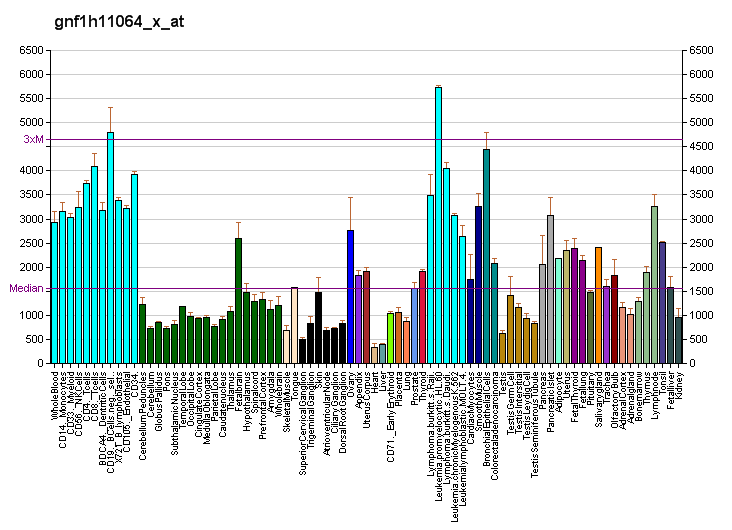
RNA expression pattern
Bgee	Human / Mouse (ortholog); Top expressed in: bone marrow cell; right uterine tube; cerebellum; cerebellar hemisphere; right hemisphere of cerebellum; ganglionic eminence; ventricular zone; olfactory zone of nasal mucosa; gonad; prefrontal cortex / Top expressed in: ganglionic eminence; spermatocyte; epiblast; dentate gyrus of hippocampal formation granule cell; ventricular zone; embryo; mesencephalon; lens; neural tube; proximal tubule; More reference expression data
BioGPS	More reference expression data
Gene ontology
Molecular function	DNA binding; protein heterodimerization activity; molecular function
Cellular component	chromosome; nucleosome; nucleus; nucleoplasm; cytosol
Biological process	nucleosome assembly
Sources:Amigo / QuickGO
Orthologs
Databases	NCBI: entry; OMA: entry
Species	Human	Mouse
Entrez	128312	382522
Ensembl	ENSG00000196890; ENSG00000285449	ENSMUSG00000080712
UniProt	Q8N257	n/a
RefSeq (mRNA)	NM_175055	NM_001393523
RefSeq (protein)	NP_778225	n/a
Location (UCSC)	Chr 1: 228.46 – 228.46 Mb	Chr 11: 58.84 – 58.85 Mb
PubMed search
- Wikidata
View/Edit Human	View/Edit Mouse

Histone H2B type 3-B is a protein that in humans is encoded by the HIST3H2BB gene.

Histones are basic nuclear proteins that are responsible for the nucleosome structure of the chromosomal fiber in eukaryotes. Nucleosomes consist of approximately 146 base pairs (bp) of DNA wrapped around a histone octamer composed of pairs of each of the four core histones (H2A, H2B, H3, and H4). The chromatin fiber is further compacted through the interaction of a linker histone, H1, with the DNA between the nucleosomes to form higher order chromatin structures. This gene is intronless and encodes a member of the histone H2B family. Transcripts from this gene contain a palindromic termination element.
