= HIST2H2AB =

Protein-coding gene in humans

H2AC21

Identifiers
- Aliases: H2AC21, H2AB, histone cluster 2, H2ab, histone cluster 2 H2A family member b, H2A clustered histone 21, HIST2H2AB
- External IDs: OMIM: 615014; MGI: 2448314; GeneCards: H2AC21

Gene location (Human)
Chr.	Chromosome 1 (human)
Band	1q21.2	Start	149,887,469 bp
Band	1q21.2	End	149,887,965 bp

Gene location (Mouse)
Chr.	Chromosome 3 (mouse)
Band	3|3 F2.1	Start	96,127,181 bp
Band	3|3 F2.1	End	96,127,624 bp
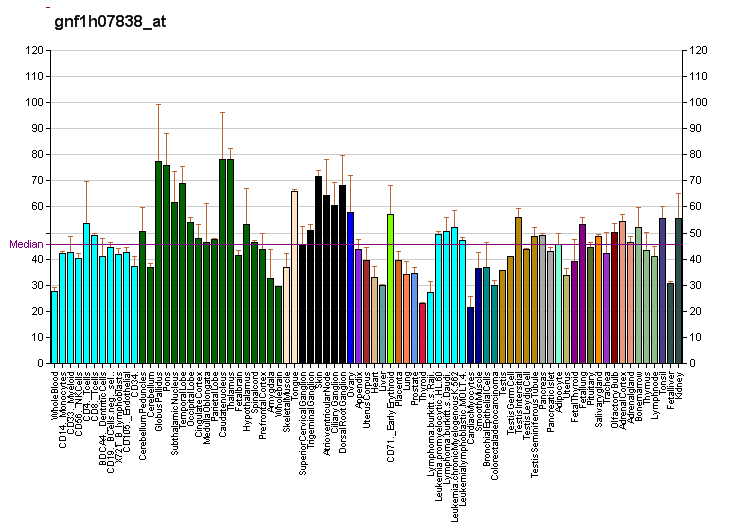
RNA expression pattern
Bgee	Human / Mouse (ortholog); Top expressed in: Achilles tendon; bone marrow cell; testicle; corpus callosum; epithelium of colon; granulocyte; sural nerve; tonsil; blood; urinary bladder / Top expressed in: genital tubercle; spermatocyte; morula; uterus; embryo; embryo; tail of embryo; urinary bladder; spermatid; striatum of neuraxis; More reference expression data
BioGPS	More reference expression data
Gene ontology
Molecular function	DNA binding; protein heterodimerization activity; molecular function
Cellular component	nucleosome; extracellular exosome; nucleus; chromosome
Biological process	chromatin organization; biological process
Sources:Amigo / QuickGO
Orthologs
Databases	NCBI: entry; OMA: entry
Species	Human	Mouse
Entrez	317772	621893
Ensembl	ENSG00000184270	ENSMUSG00000063689
UniProt	Q8IUE6	Q64522
RefSeq (mRNA)	NM_175065	NM_178213
RefSeq (protein)	NP_778235	NP_835585
Location (UCSC)	Chr 1: 149.89 – 149.89 Mb	Chr 3: 96.13 – 96.13 Mb
PubMed search
- Wikidata
View/Edit Human	View/Edit Mouse

Histone H2A type 2-B is a protein that in humans is encoded by the HIST2H2AB gene.

Histones are basic nuclear proteins that are responsible for the nucleosome structure of the chromosomal fiber in eukaryotes. Nucleosomes consist of approximately 146 bp of DNA wrapped around a histone octamer composed of pairs of each of the four core histones (H2A, H2B, H3, and H4). The chromatin fiber is further compacted through the interaction of a linker histone, H1, with the DNA between the nucleosomes to form higher order chromatin structures. This gene is intronless and encodes a member of the histone H2A family. Transcripts from this gene contain a palindromic termination element.
