= H2AFB1 =

Protein-coding gene in the species Homo sapiens

H2AB1

Identifiers
- Aliases: H2AB1, H2A.Bbd, H2A histone family member B1, H2A.B, H2A.B variant histone 1, H2AFB1, H2A.B.2
- External IDs: MGI: 3644980; GeneCards: H2AB1

Gene location (Human)
Chr.	X chromosome (human)
Band	Xq28	Start	154,884,972 bp
Band	Xq28	End	154,885,558 bp

Gene location (Mouse)
Chr.	X chromosome (mouse)
Band	X|X E1	Start	115,590,875 bp
Band	X|X E1	End	115,591,222 bp
RNA expression pattern
Bgee	Human / Mouse (ortholog); Top expressed in: testicle; apex of heart; right testis; left testis; ganglionic eminence; blood; duodenum; muscle of thigh; olfactory zone of nasal mucosa; bone marrow / Top expressed in: spleen; thymus; dentate gyrus of hippocampal formation granule cell; lung; More reference expression data
BioGPS	n/a
Gene ontology
Molecular function	DNA binding; protein heterodimerization activity
Cellular component	nucleosome; nucleus; chromosome
Biological process	nucleosome assembly; mRNA processing; chromatin organization
Sources:Amigo / QuickGO
Orthologs
Databases	NCBI: entry; OMA: entry
Species	Human	Mouse
Entrez	474382	624153
Ensembl	ENSG00000274183	ENSMUSG00000082482
UniProt	P0C5Y9	S4R1M3
RefSeq (mRNA)	NM_001017990	NM_001281530
RefSeq (protein)	NP_001017990	NP_001268459
Location (UCSC)	Chr X: 154.88 – 154.89 Mb	Chr X: 115.59 – 115.59 Mb
PubMed search
- Wikidata
View/Edit Human	View/Edit Mouse

Histone H2A-Bbd type 1 also known as H2A Barr body-deficient is a histone protein variant that in humans is encoded by the H2AFB1 gene (H2A histone family, member B1).

== Function ==
Histones are basic nuclear proteins that are responsible for the nucleosome structure of the chromosomal fiber in eukaryotes. Nucleosomes consist of approximately 146 bp of DNA wrapped around a histone octamer composed of pairs of each of the four core histones (H2A, H2B, H3, and H4). The chromatin fiber is further compacted through the interaction of a linker histone, H1, with the DNA between the nucleosomes to form higher order chromatin structures. This gene encodes a member of the histone H2A family. This gene is part of a region that is repeated three times on chromosome X, once in intron 22 of the F8 gene and twice closer to the Xq telomere. This record represents the most centromeric copy which is in intron 22 of the F8 gene.
