= HIST1H2BL =

Protein-coding gene in the species Homo sapiens

H2BC13

Identifiers
- Aliases: H2BC13, H2B/c, H2BFC, dJ97D16.4, histone cluster 1, H2bl, histone cluster 1 H2B family member l, H2B clustered histone 13, HIST1H2BL
- External IDs: OMIM: 602800; MGI: 2448388; GeneCards: H2BC13

Gene location (Human)
Chr.	Chromosome 6 (human)
Band	6p22.1	Start	27,807,479 bp
Band	6p22.1	End	27,807,929 bp

Gene location (Mouse)
Chr.	Chromosome 13 (mouse)
Band	13|13 A3.1	Start	22,227,384 bp
Band	13|13 A3.1	End	22,227,846 bp
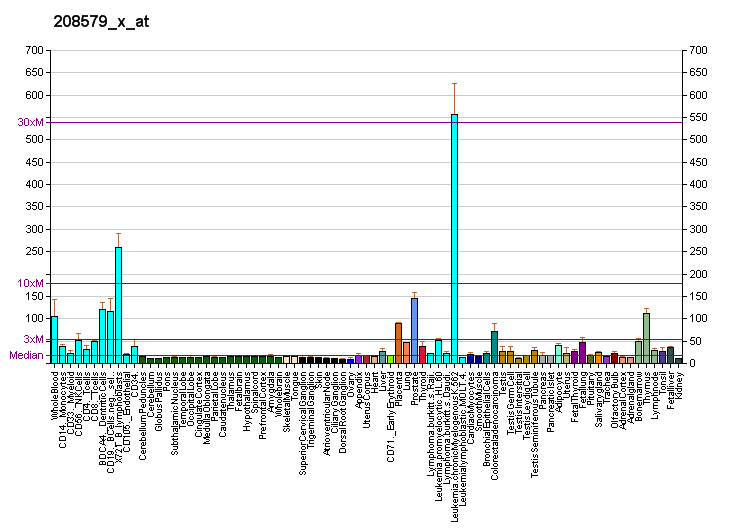

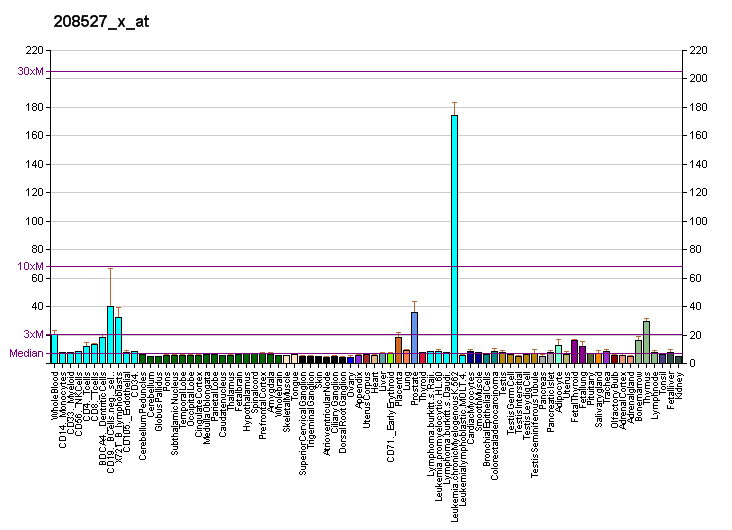

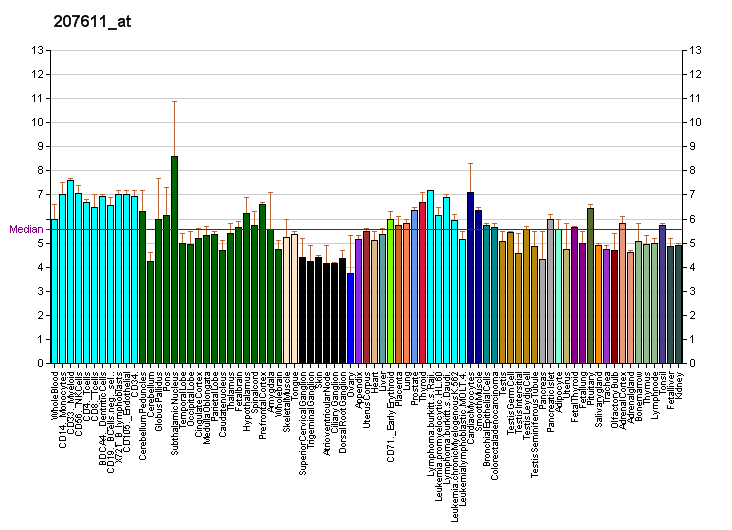
RNA expression pattern
Bgee	Human / Mouse (ortholog); Top expressed in: bone marrow cell; testicle; Achilles tendon; epithelium of colon; gonad; monocyte; tonsil; granulocyte; mucosa of transverse colon; ganglionic eminence / Top expressed in: zygote; secondary oocyte; primary oocyte; uterus; bone marrow; spermatid; genital tubercle; embryo; embryo; spermatocyte; More reference expression data
BioGPS	More reference expression data
Gene ontology
Molecular function	protein heterodimerization activity; DNA binding
Cellular component	nucleosome; nucleus; chromosome; extracellular exosome; nucleoplasm; cytosol
Biological process	nucleosome assembly; protein ubiquitination
Sources:Amigo / QuickGO
Orthologs
Databases	NCBI: entry; OMA: entry
Species	Human	Mouse
Entrez	8340	319183
Ensembl	ENSG00000185130	ENSMUSG00000069300
UniProt	Q99880	P10853
RefSeq (mRNA)	NM_003519	NM_178198
RefSeq (protein)	NP_003510	NP_835505; NP_001091448; NP_001300809; NP_001104025; NP_001300807 NP_835502; NP_835506; NP_835508
Location (UCSC)	Chr 6: 27.81 – 27.81 Mb	Chr 13: 22.23 – 22.23 Mb
PubMed search
- Wikidata
View/Edit Human	View/Edit Mouse

Histone H2B type 1-L is a protein that in humans is encoded by the HIST1H2BL gene.

Histones are basic nuclear proteins that are responsible for the nucleosome structure of the chromosomal fiber in eukaryotes. Two molecules of each of the four core histones (H2A, H2B, H3, and H4) form an octamer, around which approximately 146 bp of DNA is wrapped in repeating units, called nucleosomes. The linker histone, H1, interacts with linker DNA between nucleosomes and functions in the compaction of chromatin into higher order structures. This gene is intronless and encodes a member of the histone H2B family. Transcripts from this gene lack polyA tails but instead contain a palindromic termination element. This gene is found in the small histone gene cluster on chromosome 6p22-p21.3.
