= Histone Database =

Database of histone sequences

Content
- Description: curated database of histone proteins and their variants

Contact
- Research center: National Center for Biotechnology Information
- Primary citation: Draizen EJ, Shaytan AK, Marino-Ramirez L, Talbert PB, Landsman D, Panchenko AR (2016)

Access
- Website: https://www.ncbi.nlm.nih.gov/research/histonedb/

The Histone Database is a comprehensive database of histone protein sequences including histone variants, classified by histone types and variants, maintained by National Center for Biotechnology Information. The creation of the Histone Database was stimulated by the X-ray analysis of the structure of the nucleosomal core histone octamer followed by the application of a novel motif searching method to a group of proteins containing the histone fold motif in the early-mid-1990. The first version of the Histone Database was released in 1995 and several updates have been released since then.

Current version of the Histone Database - HistoneDB 2.0 - with variants - includes sequence and structural annotations for all five histone types (H3, H4, H2A, H2B, H1) and major histone variants within each histone type. It has many interactive tools to explore and compare sequences of different histone variants from various organisms. The core of the database is a manually curated set of histone sequences grouped into 30 different variant subsets with variant-specific annotations. The curated set is supplemented by an automatically extracted set of histone sequences from the non-redundant protein database using algorithms trained on the curated set. The interactive web site supports various searching strategies in both datasets: browsing of phylogenetic trees; on-demand generation of multiple sequence alignments with feature annotations; classification of histone-like sequences and browsing of the taxonomic diversity for every histone variant.
