= Histone H2A.Z =

Protein-coding gene in the species Homo sapiens

H2AZ1
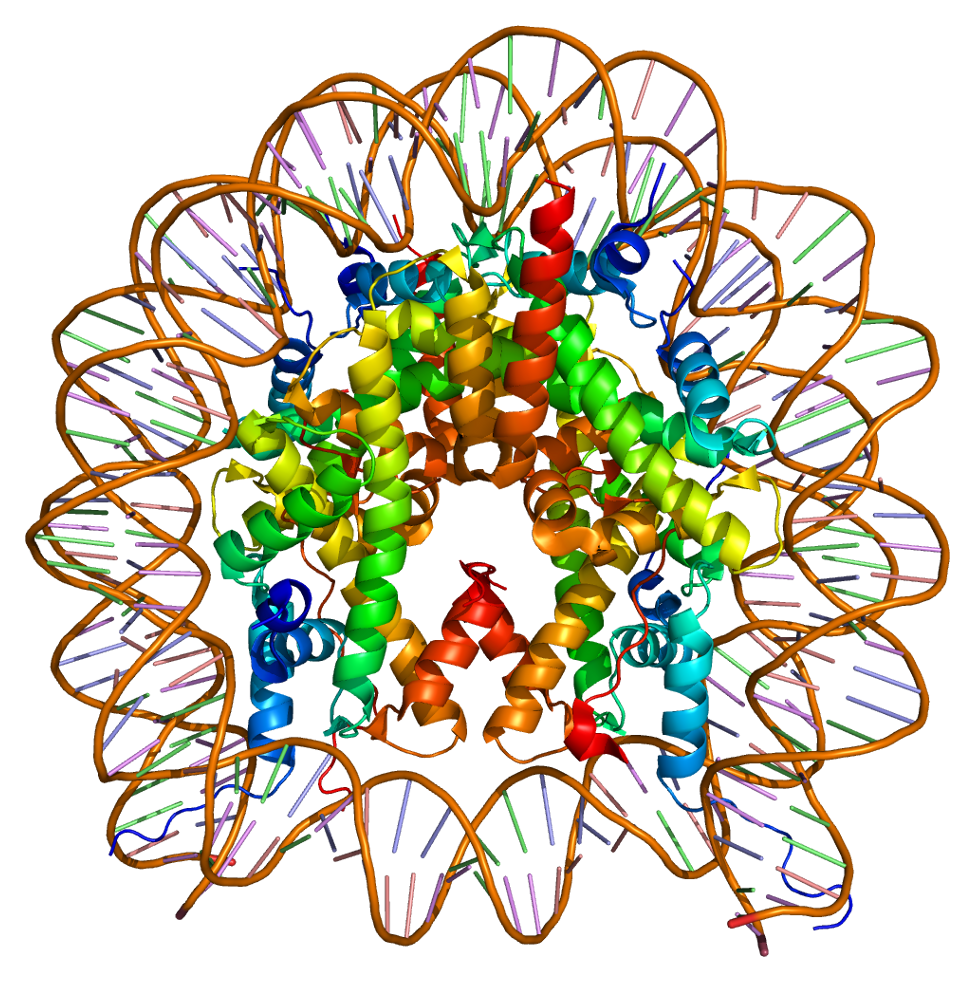

Identifiers
- Aliases: H2AZ1, H2A.Z-1, H2A.z, H2A/z, H2AZ, H2A histone family member Z, H2A.Z variant histone 1, H2AFZ
- External IDs: OMIM: 142763; MGI: 1888388; GeneCards: H2AZ1
Available structures
PDB	Ortholog search: PDBe RCSB
PDB	List of PDB id codes 1F66, 3WA9, 4CAY, 4NFT, 5FUG, 5CHL

Gene location (Human)
Chr.	Chromosome 4 (human)
Band	4q23	Start	99,948,086 bp
Band	4q23	End	99,950,355 bp

Gene location (Mouse)
Chr.	Chromosome 3 (mouse)
Band	3|3 G3	Start	137,570,248 bp
Band	3|3 G3	End	137,572,683 bp
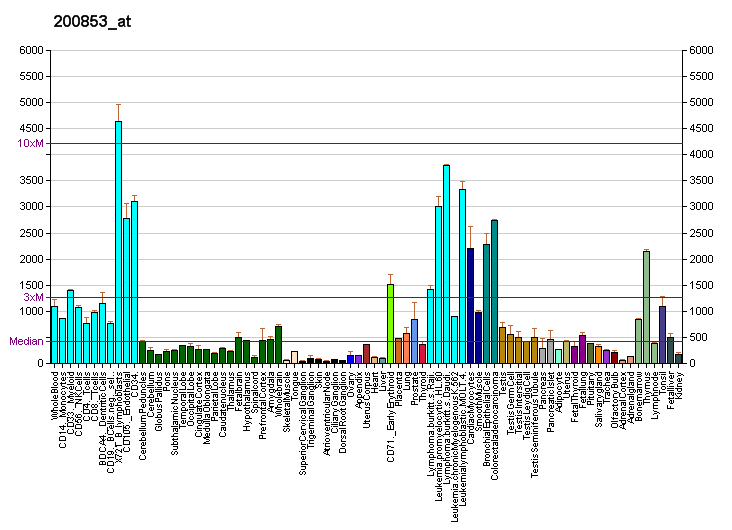

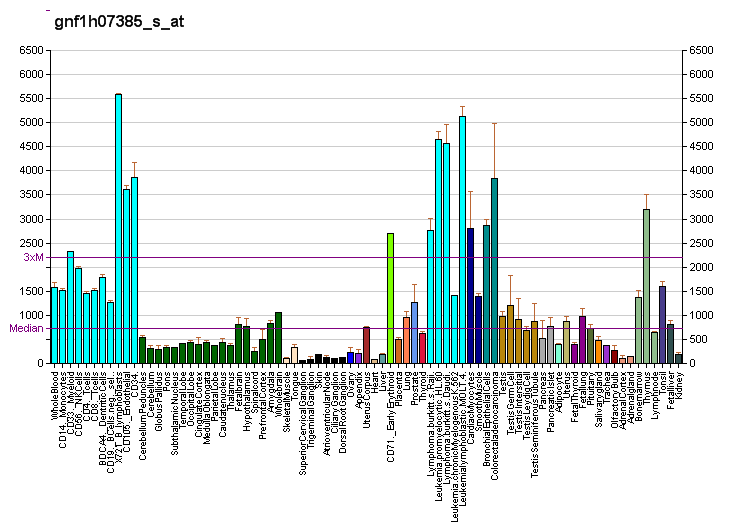

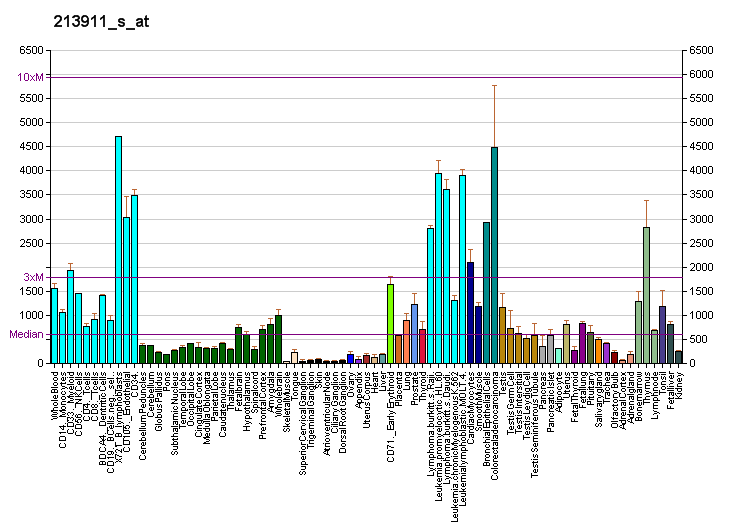
RNA expression pattern
Bgee	Human / Mouse (ortholog); Top expressed in: ventricular zone; embryo; ganglionic eminence; gingival epithelium; palpebral conjunctiva; germinal epithelium; trabecular bone; human penis; epithelium of nasopharynx; mucosa of transverse colon / Top expressed in: ventricular zone; tail of embryo; blastocyst; embryo; genital tubercle; thymus; embryo; spermatocyte; epiblast; neural tube; More reference expression data
BioGPS	More reference expression data
Gene ontology
Molecular function	nucleosomal DNA binding; RNA polymerase II cis-regulatory region sequence-specific DNA binding; DNA binding; chromatin DNA binding; protein binding; RNA polymerase II core promoter sequence-specific DNA binding; protein heterodimerization activity
Cellular component	nucleosome; extracellular exosome; Barr body; nucleus; chromosome
Biological process	cellular response to estradiol stimulus; positive regulation of transcription by RNA polymerase II; chromatin organization
Sources:Amigo / QuickGO
Orthologs
Databases	NCBI: entry; OMA: entry
Species	Human	Mouse
Entrez	3015	51788
Ensembl	ENSG00000164032	ENSMUSG00000037894
UniProt	P0C0S5	P0C0S6
RefSeq (mRNA)	NM_002106	NM_016750; NM_001316995
RefSeq (protein)	NP_002097	NP_001303924; NP_058030
Location (UCSC)	Chr 4: 99.95 – 99.95 Mb	Chr 3: 137.57 – 137.57 Mb
PubMed search
- Wikidata
View/Edit Human	View/Edit Mouse

Histone H2A.Z is a protein encoded by the H2AZ1 gene in humans.

== Function ==
Histones are basic nuclear proteins that are responsible for the nucleosome structure of the chromosomal fiber in eukaryotes. Nucleosomes consist of approximately 146 base pairs(bp) of DNA wrapped around a histone octamer, which includes pairs of each of the four core histones (H2A, H2B, H3, and H4). The chromatin fiber is further compacted by the interaction of a linker histone, H1, with the DNA between the nucleosomes to form higher order chromatin structures. The H2AFZ gene encodes a replication-independent member of the histone H2A family that is distinct from other members of the family.

== Biological importance ==
Studies in mice have shown that this particular histone is required for embryonic development and indicate that lack of functional histone H2A leads to embryonic lethality.

Histone H2AZ is a variant of histone H2A, and is used to mediate the thermosensory response, and is essential to perceive the ambient temperature. Nucleosome occupancy of H2A.Z decreases with temperature, and in vitro assays show that H2A.Z-containing nucleosomes wrap DNA more tightly than canonical H2A nucleosomes in Arabidopsis.(Cell 140: 136–147, 2010) However, some of the other studies (Nat. Genet. 41, 941–945 and Genes Dev., 21, 1519–1529) have shown that incorporation of H2A.Z in nucleosomes, when it co-occurs with H3.3, makes them weaker.

== Gene expression and chromatin structure ==
The positioning of H2A.Z-containing nucleosomes around transcription start sites has been shown to affect the downstream gene expression. Recent evidence also points to a role for H2A.Z in repressing a subset of non-coding RNAs, derepressing cryptic unstable transcripts, as well as mediating higher order chromatin structure formation.
