= Histone variants =

Proteins that substitute in eukaryotes

Histone variants are proteins that substitute for the core canonical histones (H3, H4, H2A, H2B) in nucleosomes in eukaryotes and often confer specific structural and functional features. The term might also include a set of linker histone (H1) variants, which lack a distinct canonical isoform. The differences between the core canonical histones and their variants can be summarized as follows: (1) canonical histones are replication-dependent and are expressed during the S-phase of cell cycle whereas histone variants are replication-independent and are expressed during the whole cell cycle; (2) in animals, the genes encoding canonical histones are typically clustered along the chromosome, are present in multiple copies and are among the most conserved proteins known, whereas histone variants are often single-copy genes and show high degree of variation among species; (3) canonical histone genes lack introns and use a stem loop structure at the 3' end of their mRNA, whereas histone variant genes may have introns and their mRNA tail is usually polyadenylated. Complex multicellular organisms typically have a large number of histone variants providing a variety of different functions. Recent data are accumulating about the roles of diverse histone variants highlighting the functional links between variants and the delicate regulation of organism development.

== Histone variants nomenclature ==
Different names historically assigned to homologous proteins in different species complicate the nomenclature of histone variants. A recently suggested unified nomenclature of histone variants follows phylogeny-based approach to naming the variants. According to this nomenclature, letter suffixes or prefixes are mainly used to denote structurally distinct monophyletic clades of a histone family (e.g. H2A.Z, H2B.W, subH2B). Number suffixes are assumed to be species-specific (e.g. H1.1), but are encouraged to be used consistently between species where unique orthologies are clear. However, due to historical reasons naming of certain variants may still deviate from these rules.

== Variants of histone H3 ==
Throughout eukaryotes the most common histone H3 variants are H3.3 and centromeric H3 variant (cenH3, called also CENPA in humans). Well studied species specific variants include H3.1, H3.2, TS H3.4 (mammals), H3.5 (hominids), H3.Y (primates). Except for cenH3 histone, H3 variants are highly sequence conserved differing only by a few amino acids. Histone H3.3 has been found to play an important role in maintaining genome integrity during the mammalian development.

== Variants of histone H4 ==
Histone H4 is one of the slowest evolving proteins with no functional variants in the majority of species. The reason for a lack of sequence variants remains unclear. Trypanosoma are known to have a variant of H4 named H4.V. In Drosophila there are H4 replacement genes that are constitutively expressed throughout the cell cycle that encode proteins that are identical in sequence to the major H4.

== Variants of histone H2A ==
Histone H2A has the highest number of known variants, some of which are relatively well characterized. H2A.X is the most common H2A variant, with the defining sequence motif 'SQ(E/D)Φ' (where Φ-represents a hydrophobic residue, usually Tyr in mammals). It becomes phosphorylated during the DNA damage response, chromatin remodeling, and X-chromosome inactivation in somatic cells. H2A.X and canonical H2A have diverged several times in phylogenetic history, but each H2A.X version is characterized by similar structure and function, suggesting it may represent the ancestral state. H2A.Z regulates transcription, DNA repair, suppression of antisense RNA, and RNA Polymerase II recruitment. Notable features of H2A.Z include a sequence motif 'DEELD,' a one amino acid insertion in L1-loop, and a one amino acid deletion in the docking domain relative to canonical H2A. Variant H2A.Z.2 was suggested to be driving the progression of melanoma. Canonical H2A can be exchanged in nucleosomes for H2A.Z with special remodeling enzymes. macroH2A contains a histone fold domain and an extra, long C-terminal macro domain which can bind poly-ADP-ribose. This histone variant is used in X-inactivation and transcriptional regulation. Structures of both domains are available, but the inter-domain linker is too flexible to be crystallized. H2A.B (Barr body deficient variant) is a rapidly evolving mammal specific variant, known for its involvement in spermatogenesis. H2A.B has a shortened docking domain, which wraps around a short DNA region. H2A.L and H2A.P variants are closely related to H2A.B, but are less studied. H2A.W is a plant specific variant with SPKK motifs at the N-terminus with a putative minor-groove-binding activity. H2A.1 is a mammalian testis, oocyte and zygote specific variant. It can preferentially dimerize with H2B.1. It is so far characterized only in mouse, but a similar gene in human is available which is located at the end of the largest histone gene cluster. Currently other less extensively studied H2A variants are starting to emerge such as H2A.J.

== Variants of histone H2B ==
H2B histone type is known to have a limited number of variants at least in mammals, apicomplexa and sea urchins. H2B.1 is a testis, oocyte and zygote specific variant that forms subnucleosomal particles, at least, in spermatids. It can dimerize with H2A.L and H2A.1. H2B.W is involved in spermatogenesis, telomere associated functions in sperm and is found in spermatogenic cells. It is characterized by the extension of the N-terminal tail. subH2B participates in regulation of spermiogenesis and is found in non-nucleosomal particle in the subacrosome of spermatozoa. This variant has a bipartite nuclear localization signal. H2B.Z is an apicomplexan specific variant that is known to interact with H2A.Z. 'sperm H2B' is a putative group that contains sperm H2B histones from sea and sand urchins and potentially is common for Echinacea. Recently discovered variant H2B.E is involved in the regulation of olfactory neuron function in mice.

== Databases and resources ==
"HistoneDB 2.0 - with variants", a database of histones and their variants maintained by National Center for Biotechnology Information, currently serves as the most comprehensive manually curated resource on histones and their variants that follows the new unified phylogeny-based nomenclature of histone variants. "Histome: The Histone Infobase" is manually curated database of histone variants in humans and associated post-translational modifications as well as modifying enzymes. MS_HistoneDB is a proteomics-oriented manually curated databases for mouse and human histone variants.
