= Beena Pillai =

Indian microbiologist

- Born: Kerala, India
- Education: Ramnarain Ruia College; University of Mumbai; Indian Institute of Science
- Known for: Studies on transcription, non coding RNA and histone variants
- Awards: 2008 CSIR Young Scientist Award; 2009 INSA Young Scientist Medal; 2017–18 N-BIOS Prize
- Scientific career
- Fields: Microbiology; Genetics
- Workplaces: Institute of Genomics and Integrative Biology

Beena Ramakrishnan Pillai is an Indian microbiologist, geneticist, and a scientist at the Institute of Genomics and Integrative Biology. She is known for her studies on gene regulation influenced by small RNA and histone variants and is a recipient of the Young Scientist Award of the Council of Scientific and Industrial Research and the Young Scientist Medal of the INSA. The Department of Biotechnology of the Government of India awarded her the National Bioscience Award for Career Development, one of the highest Indian science awards, for her contributions to biosciences, in 2017–18.

== Biography ==
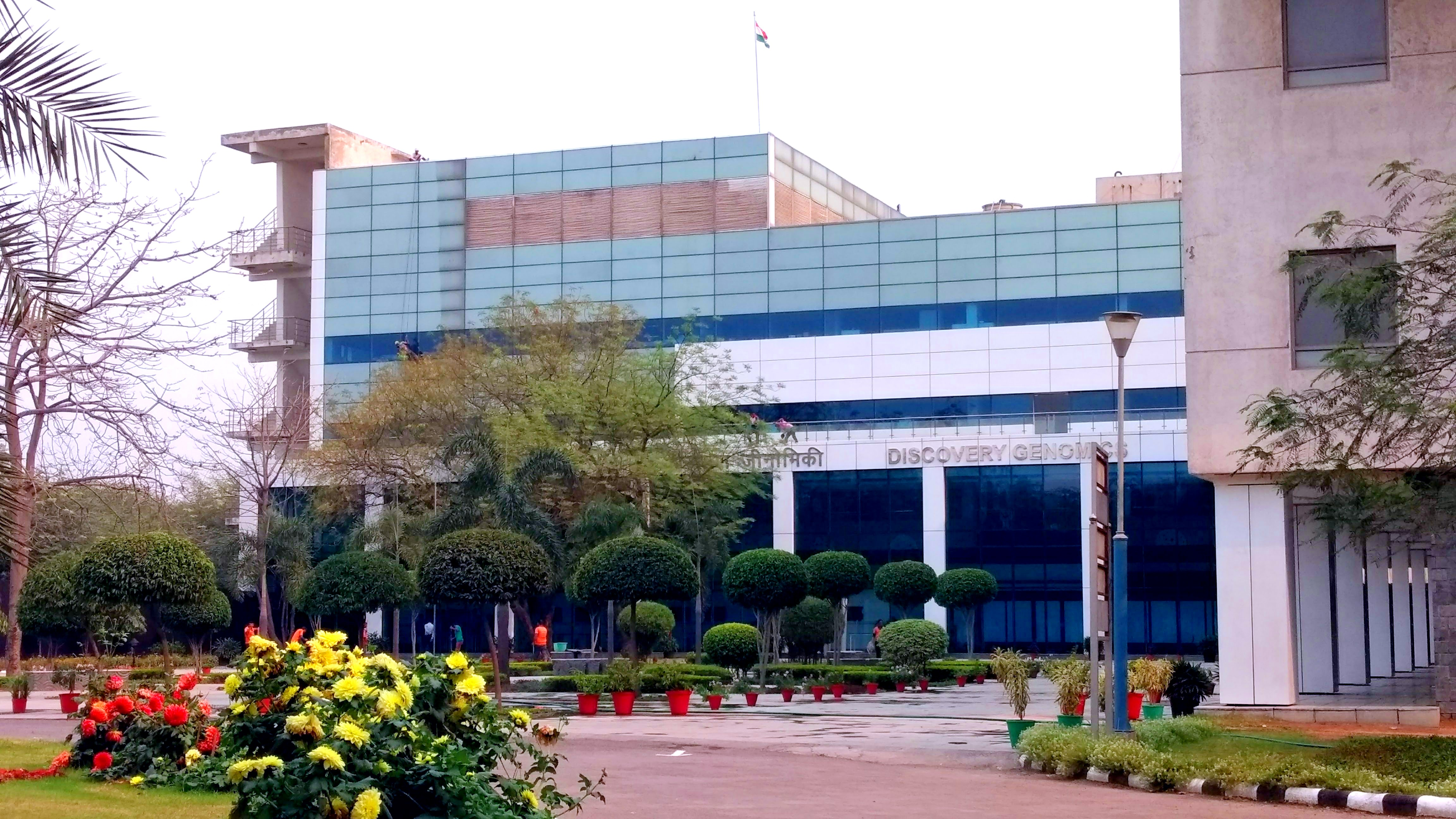
CSIR-Institute of Genomics and Integrative Biology

Pillai, born in the south Indian state of Kerala, obtained her BSc in microbiology from Ramnarain Ruia College of the University of Mumbai in 1995 and joined the Indian Institute of Science for the integrated program which earned her an MS in life sciences in 1998 and a PhD in 2002. She did her post-doctoral training as a fellow at the Institute of Genomics and Integrative Biology (IGIB) during 2002–04 and started her career at IGIB as a scientist in 2004. After serving as a principal scientist during 2007–11, she holds the position of a senior principal scientist and heads a laboratory, popularly known as Beena Pillai's Lab, as its principal investigator where she hosts several researchers.

Pillai's research focuses the fields of non-coding RNA in neuronal function and dysfunction, regulation of neural gene expression mediated by histone variants and nerve regeneration factor from Earthworm. She has published a number of articles; (Note: Please see Selected bibliography section) ResearchGate, an online repository of scientific articles has listed 79 of them.

== Awards and honors ==
Pillai received the Young Scientist Award of the Council of Scientific and Industrial Research in 2008 for her work in transcriptomics and a year later, she was selected by the Indian National Science Academy for the 2009 Young Scientist Medal. The Department of Biotechnology of the Government of India awarded her the National Bioscience Award for Career Development, one of the highest Indian science awards, for her contributions to biosciences, in 2017–18.

== Selected bibliography ==
- Pillai, Beena; Sivasubbu, Sridhar; Scaria, Vinod; Peterson, Kevin J.; Fromm, Bastian; Khan, Jameel Ahmed; Khanna, Yukti; Gautam, Pradeep; Kumar, Vikram (27 September 2018). "Large scale changes in the transcriptome of Eisenia fetida during regeneration". PLOS ONE. 13 (9) e0204234. Bibcode:2018PLoSO..1304234B. doi:10.1371/journal.pone.0204234. ISSN 1932-6203. PMC 6160089. PMID 30260966.
- Pillai, Beena; Maiti, Souvik; Sivasubbu, Sridhar; Vellarikkal, Shamsudheen Karuthedath; Iyengar, Bharat Ravi; Sharma, Surbhi; Ramasamy, Soundhar (1 January 2019). "Identification of novel circadian transcripts in the zebrafish retina". Journal of Experimental Biology. 222 (1): jeb192195. doi:10.1242/jeb.192195. ISSN 1477-9145. PMID 30446534.
- Roshan, Reema; Choudhary, Ashwani; Bhambri, Aksheev; Bakshi, Bhawani; Ghosh, Tanay; Pillai, Beena (3 August 2017). "microRNA dysregulation in polyglutamine toxicity of TATA-box binding protein is mediated through STAT1 in mouse neuronal cells". Journal of Neuroinflammation. 14 (1): 155. doi:10.1186/s12974-017-0925-3. ISSN 1742-2094. PMC 5543588. PMID 28774347.
- Gadgil, Chetan J.; Venkatesh, K. V.; Pillai, Beena; Iyengar, Bharat Ravi (30 May 2017). "Systematic comparison of the response properties of protein and RNA mediated gene regulatory motifs". Molecular BioSystems. 13 (6): 1235–1245. doi:10.1039/C6MB00808A. ISSN 1742-2051. PMID 28485414.
- Pillai, Beena; Ranjan, Shashi; Kumar, Manish; Km, Monisha; Bhatt, Abhishek; Chaubey, Divya; Sarangdhar, Mayuresh A. (2017). "A Novel Long Non-coding RNA, durga Modulates Dendrite Density and Expression of kalirin in Zebrafish". Frontiers in Molecular Neuroscience. 10: 95. doi:10.3389/fnmol.2017.00095. ISSN 1662-5099. PMC 5385350. PMID 28442991.

== See also ==
- Zebrafish
- microRNA
