= H2AFB2 =

Protein-coding gene in the species Homo sapiens

H2AB2

Identifiers
- Aliases: H2AB2, H2A.Bbd, H2A histone family member B2, H2A.B variant histone 2, H2AFB2, H2AB3, H2A.B.1
- External IDs: MGI: 3644875; GeneCards: H2AB2

Gene location (Human)
Chr.	X chromosome (human)
Band	Xq28	Start	155,380,709 bp
Band	Xq28	End	155,381,299 bp

Gene location (Mouse)
Chr.	X chromosome (mouse)
Band	X|X E2	Start	119,222,445 bp
Band	X|X E2	End	119,222,792 bp
RNA expression pattern
Bgee	Human / Mouse (ortholog); Top expressed in: gonad; left testis; granulocyte; right testis; mucosa of transverse colon; right uterine tube; gastric mucosa; primary visual cortex; canal of the cervix; right adrenal cortex / Top expressed in: testicle; spermatid; striatum of neuraxis; Cortex of frontal lobe; cerebellum; hypothalamus; mesencephalon; superior frontal gyrus; primary visual cortex; spleen; More reference expression data
BioGPS	n/a
Gene ontology
Molecular function	protein heterodimerization activity; DNA binding
Cellular component	nucleosome; nucleus; chromosome
Biological process	nucleosome assembly; mRNA processing; chromatin organization
Sources:Amigo / QuickGO
Orthologs
Databases	NCBI: entry; OMA: entry
Species	Human	Mouse
Entrez	474381	624957
Ensembl	ENSG00000277858	ENSMUSG00000083616
UniProt	P0C5Z0	S4R1G7
RefSeq (mRNA)	NM_001017991	NM_001281531
RefSeq (protein)	NP_001017991	NP_001268460
Location (UCSC)	Chr X: 155.38 – 155.38 Mb	Chr X: 119.22 – 119.22 Mb
PubMed search
- Wikidata
View/Edit Human	View/Edit Mouse

Histone H2A-Bbd type 2/3 also known as H2A Barr body-deficient is a histone protein that in humans is encoded by the H2AFB2 gene (H2A histone family, member B1).

== Function ==
Histones are basic nuclear proteins that are responsible for the nucleosome structure of the chromosomal fiber in eukaryotes. Nucleosomes consist of approximately 146 bp of DNA wrapped around a histone octamer composed of pairs of each of the four core histones (H2A, H2B, H3, and H4). The chromatin fiber is further compacted through the interaction of a linker histone, H1, with the DNA between the nucleosomes to form higher order chromatin structures. This gene encodes a member of the histone H2A family. This gene is part of a region that is repeated three times on chromosome X, once in intron 22 of the F8 gene and twice closer to the Xq telomere. This record represents the middle copy.
