= Histone fold =

Identifiers
- Symbol: Histone
- Pfam clan: CL0012
- ECOD: 148.1.1
- InterPro: IPR009072
- SCOP2: 47112 / SCOPe / SUPFAM
- CDD: cl45933
Available protein structures:
- PDB: IPR009072
- AlphaFold: IPR009072

The histone fold is a structural motif located near the C-terminus of histone proteins (H2/H3/H4), characterized by three alpha helices separated by two loops. This motif facilitates the formation of histone heterodimers, which subsequently assemble into a histone octamer, playing a crucial role in the packaging of DNA into nucleosomes within chromatin. This fold is an ancient and highly conserved structural motif, essential for DNA compaction and regulation across a wide range of species.

== Discovery ==
The histone fold motif was first discovered in TATA box-binding protein-associated factors, which play a key role in transcription.

== Structure ==
The histone fold is typically around 70 amino acids long and is characterized by three alpha helices connected by two short, unstructured loops. In the absence of DNA, core histones assemble into head-to-tail intermediates. For instance, H3 and H4 first form heterodimers, which then combine to form a tetramer. Similarly, H2A and H2B form heterodimers. These interactions occur through hydrophobic "handshake" interactions between histone fold domains.

Histones H4 and H2A can form internucleosomal contacts that, when acetylated, enable ionic interactions between peptides. These interactions can alter the surrounding internucleosomal contacts, leading to chromatin opening and increased accessibility for transcription.

== Function ==
The histone fold is a multifunctional domain. It is found in both histones and non-histone transcription factors. It serves a wide range of related functions including protein-DNA binding and protein dimerization. Non-histone examples include CBF/NF-Y, TBP-associated factors (TAFs), the TBP/TATA-binding negative cofactor 2 (NC2α/β), and the CHRAC15/CHRAC17 subunits of the nucleosome remodeling complex CHRAC.

=== Histones ===
The histone fold plays a crucial role in nucleosome formation by mediating interactions between histones. The largest interface surfaces are found in the heterotypic dimer interactions of H3-H4 and H2A-H2B. These interactions are primarily mediated by the "handshake" motif between histone fold domains. Additionally, the H2A structure has a unique loop modification at its interface, contributing to its distinct role in transcriptional activation.

=== CBF/NF-Y ===
The nuclear transcription factor Y (NF-Y) also known as the CCAAT-binding factor (CBF) is a transcriptional factor highly conserved among eukaryotes (including humans). It is a heterotrimer composed of NFYA, NFYB, and NFYC. NFYA has a sequence-specific, non-histone-fold DNA-binding domain, while NFYB and NFYC both have a non-sequence-specific histone-fold DNA-binding domain. NFYB and NFYC form a structure similar to H2A/H2B.

== Evolution ==
The histone fold is thought to have evolved from ancestral peptide sets that formed helix-strand-helix motifs. These peptides are believed to have originated from ancient fragments, which may be precursors to the modern H3-H4 tetramer found in eukaryotes. Archaea possess single-chain histones with a similar DNA-packaging function, suggesting a shared ancestry between eukaryotes and archaea. One bacterium, Aquifex aeolicus, also has one archaeal-type histone gene from later horizontal gene transfer.

Expansion of bacterial genomic data has identified many other histone-fold proteins. The Bd0055 of Bdellovibrio bacteriovorus exhibits two unconventional (compared to eukaryotic and archaeal histone) modes of DNA-binding. The HLp of Leptospira perolatii is comparatively more conventional. Only 1.86% of bacteria genomes surveyed in 2023 contain a histone-fold protein, compared to 92.8% of genomes that encode HU (histone-like DNA-binding protein).

== See also ==
- Double histone fold
