= Varsha Adalja =

Indian author (born 1940)

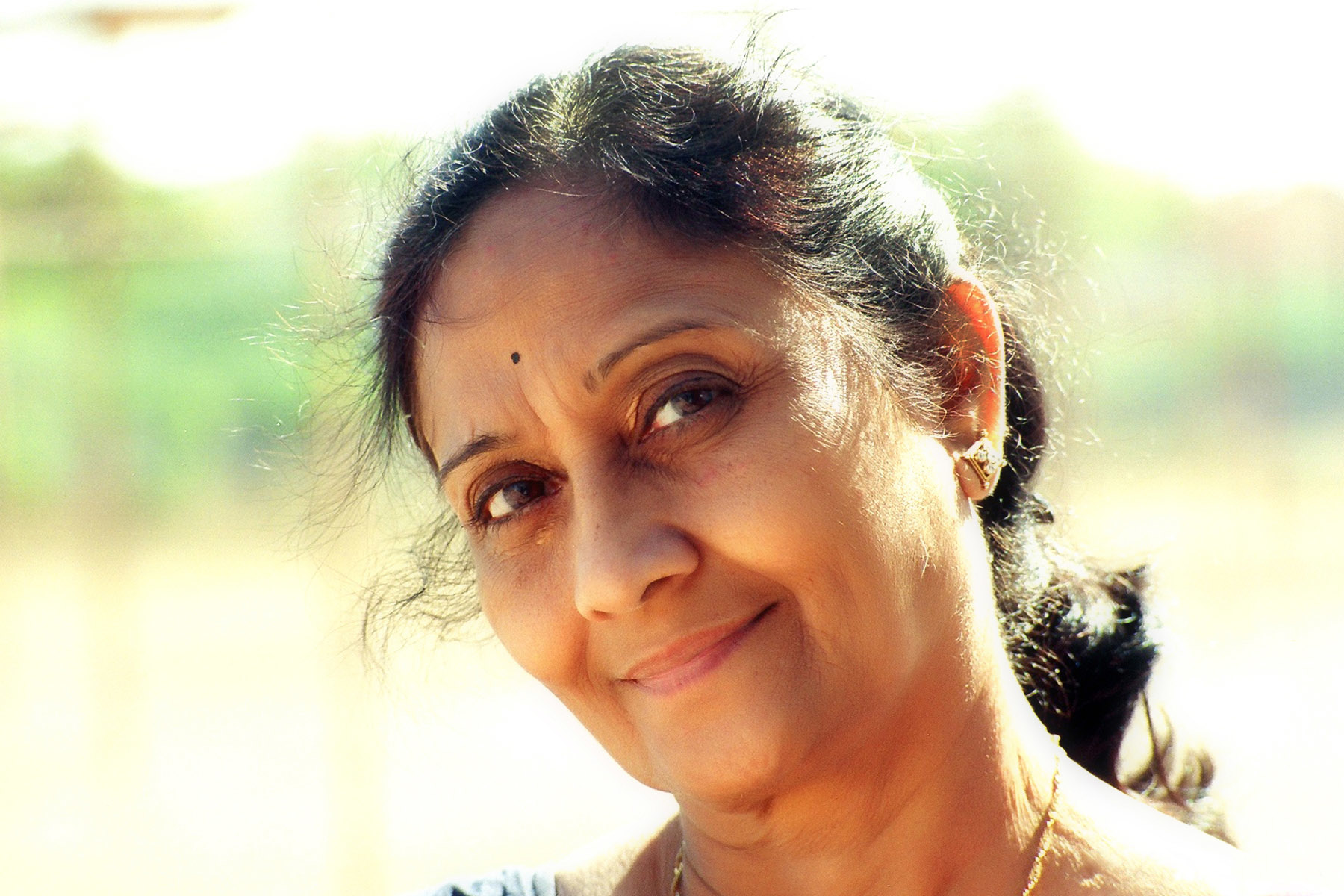
- Adalja at Jamnagar, 1995
- Born: 10 April 1940 (age 86); Bombay (present Mumbai), Bombay Presidency, British India
- Occupations: Novelist; playwright; negotiator
- Writing career
- Language: Gujarati
- Notable work: Ansar
- Notable awards: Sahitya Academy Award (1995); Ranjitram Suvarna Chandrak (2005)

Varsha Mahendra Adalja (born 10 April 1940) is an Indian Gujarati language feminist novelist, playwright and negotiator, who won the 1995 Sahitya Akademi Award for Gujarati language for her novel Ansar. She is also a dramatist, writing for stage plays, screenplays, and radio.

== Early life ==
She was born on 10 April 1940 in Bombay (now Mumbai) to Gunvantrai Acharya, Gujarati novelist, and Nilaben. Her family belonged to Jamnagar. She completed B.A. in Gujarati and Sanskrit from Mumbai University in 1960. Later she completed M.A. in Sociology in 1962. She studied drama at National School of Drama, Delhi under scholarship. She worked as a spokesperson of Akashvani, Mumbai from 1961 to 1964. She married Mahendra Adalja in 1965. She started writing in 1966. Her sister Ila Arab Mehta is also a novelist.

== Literary career ==
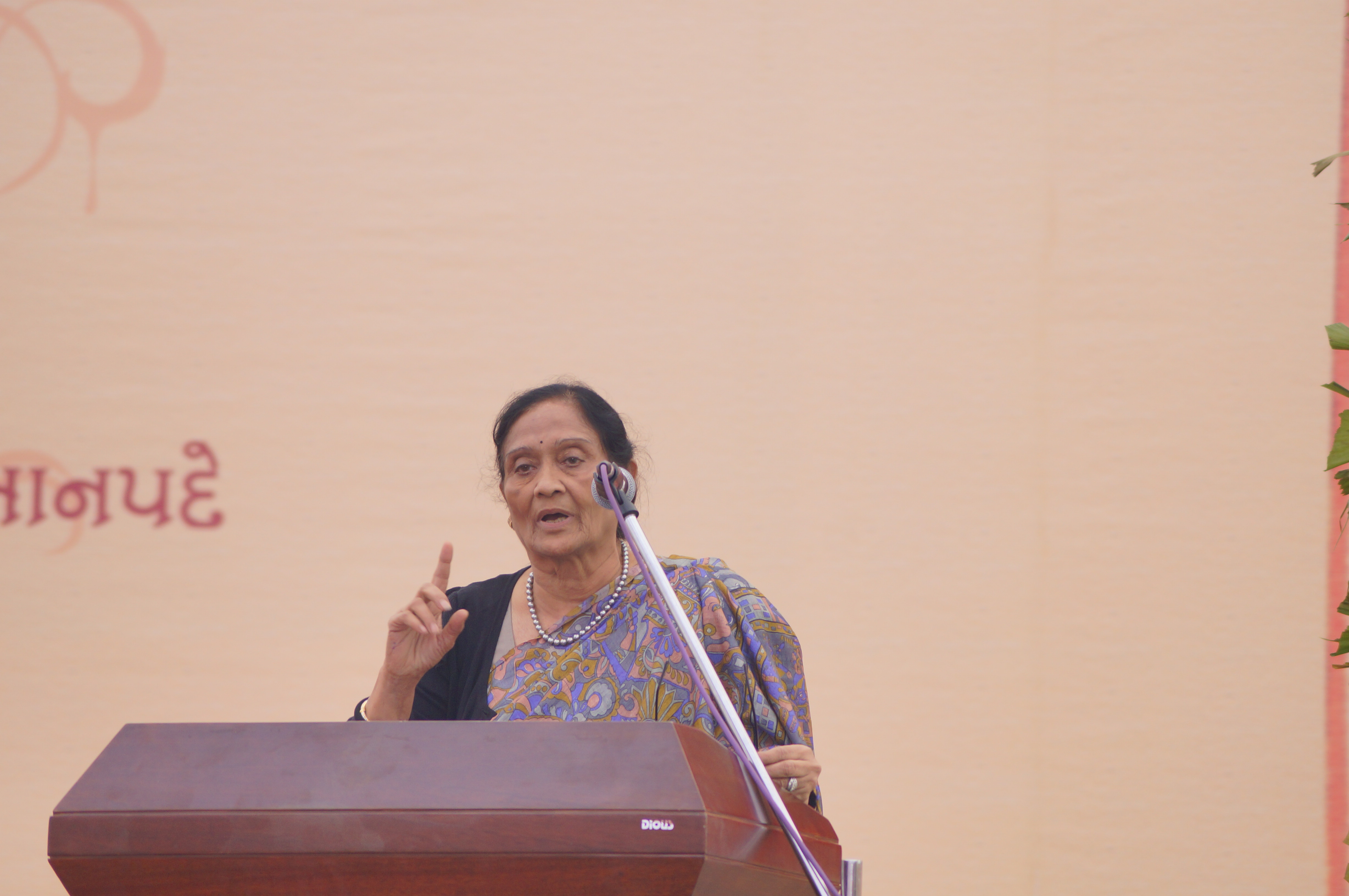
Varsha Adalja at 47th annual conference of Gujarati Sahitya Parishad

Varsha Adalja started her literary career as an editor of Sudha, a women's weekly from 1973–1976, and later with Gujarati Femina, another women's magazine from 1989–90. She holds an executive office with Gujarati Sahitya Parishad since 1978. She has explored lepers’ colonies, prison life and has worked among adivasis.

== Works ==
She has penned 40 books, including 22 novels and seven volumes of short stories. Shravan Tara Saravada (1968) and Timirna Padchhaya (1969) are her initial novels, followed by Ek Palni Parakh (1969). Panch ne ek Panch (1969), Avajno Akar (1975), Chhevatnu Chhevat (1976), Pachha Farata (1991) and Pagala (1983) are her suspense novels. Neelima Mrutyu Pami Chhe (1977) is a social as well as suspense novel. Atash (1976) is a novel on violence in Vietnam. Her Bandivan (1986) is about corruption in jails.

Her other novels are:

- Ganth Chuutyani Vela (1980),
- Mrityudand (1996),
- Matinu Ghar (1991),
- Shag Re Shakoru (2004),
- Paratham Pagalu Mandiyu (2008) and
- Pagalu Mandu Hu Avkashma (2005)

Her other novellas are:

- Mare Pan Ek Ghar Hoy (1971),
- Retpankhi (1974) and
- Khari Padelo Tahuko (1983)

Khari Padelo Tahuko also includes another novella Ek Karagar in its book. Ansar (1992) is her most celebrated novel on lepers.

Her short story collections are E (1979), Sanjne Umbare (1983), Endhani (1989), Bilipatranu Chothu Paan (1994), Ganthe Bandhyu Akash (1998), Anuradha (2003) and Koi Var Thay Ke... (2004). Her selected stories are published as Varsha Adaljani Shreshth Vartao (1992) edited by Ila Arab Mehta.

Mandodari (1998) is a collection of one-act plays. Aa Chhe Karagar (1986), Tirad, Shaheed (2003), Vasanti Koyal (2006) are her plays. Her novels Mare Pan Ek Ghar Hoy and Retpankhi are adapted for short TV series. Timirna Padchhaya was adapted into three-act play and has more than a hundred shows. She adapted her father's novel as Daridranarayan as TV series and later as a play. She has produced an award-winning television film on leprosy, Ansar.

Her essay collections include Prithvi Tirth (1994) and Akhu Akash Ek Pinjarma (2007). Her travelogues are Nabh Zukyu (2002), Ghughave Chhe Jal (2002), Shivoham (2006) and Sharanagat (2007). She edited Amar Premkathao (2000).

Crossroad was published in 2016. It is a magnum opus historical novel spread over three generations.

== Awards ==
She received Sahitya Akademi Award (1995) for her novel Ansar. She also received Soviet Land Nehru Award (1976), Gujarati Sahitya Academy Award (1977, 1979, 1980), Gujarati Sahitya Parishad Award (1972, 1975) and K. M. Munshi Award (1997). She received Ranjitram Suvarna Chandrak in 2005. She has received Nandshankar Mehta Chandrak, Saroj Pathak Prize and Ramnarayan Pathak Short Story Prize for story writing.

== See also ==
- List of Sahitya Akademi Award winners for Gujarati
- List of Gujarati-language writers

Awards
Preceded by Ramesh Parekh	Recipient of the Sahitya Akademi Award winners for Gujarati; 1995	Succeeded by Himanshi Shelat
