= Ramnarain Ruia College =

College in Matunga, Mumbai, India

Ramnarain Ruia Autonomous College
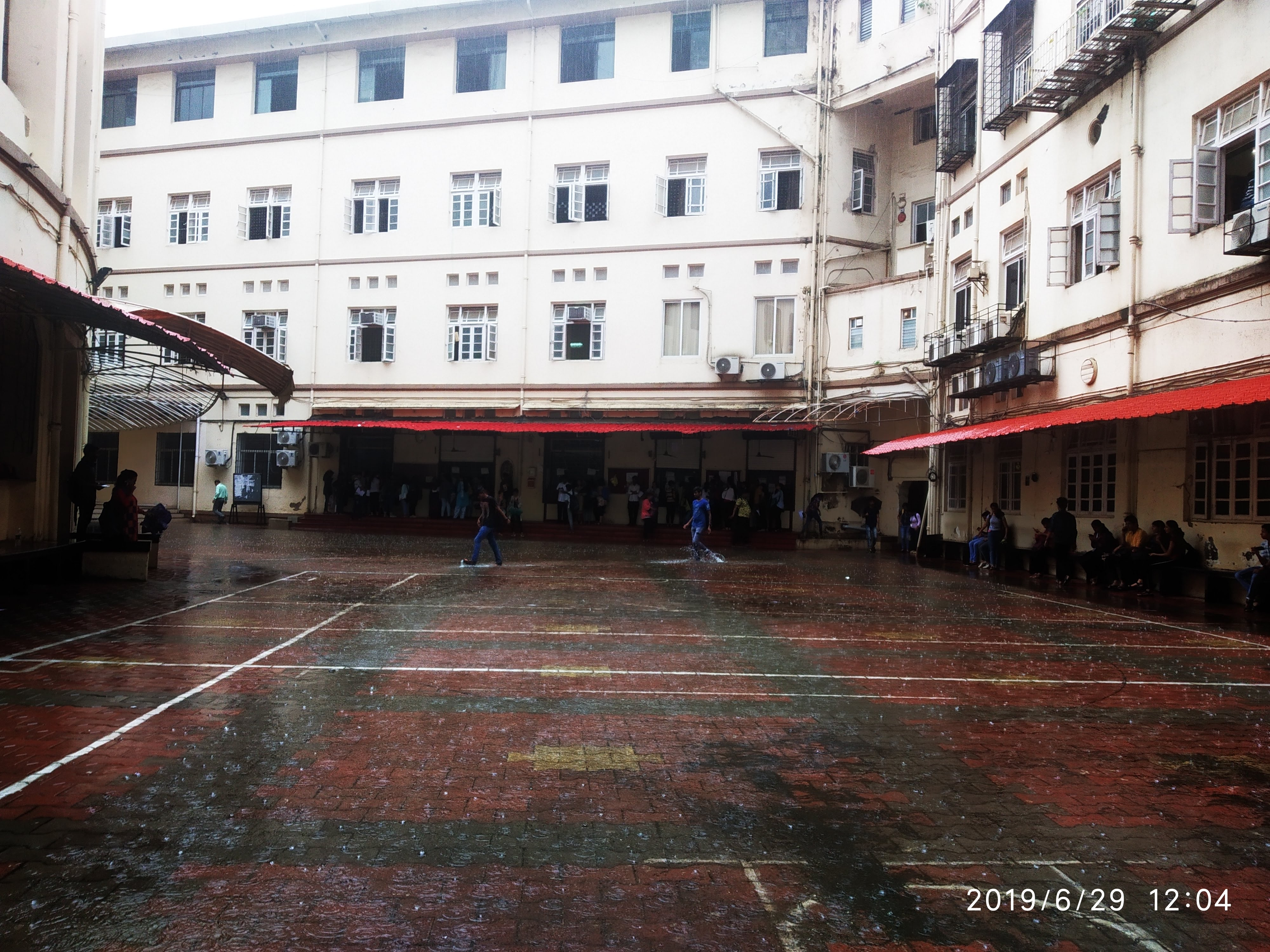
- Motto: Explore. Experience. Excel.
- Type: Public
- Established: June 1937; 89 years ago
- Academic affiliations: University of Mumbai; Maharashtra State Board of Secondary and Higher Secondary Education
- Principal: Anushree Lokur
- Location: Matunga (Central), Mumbai, Maharashtra, India
- Campus: Suburban
- Website: www.ruiacollege.edu

Ramnarain Ruia Autonomous College is a college affiliated to the University of Mumbai, in Matunga, Mumbai, India. It was established in June 1937. The University of Mumbai granted autonomous status to the college in 2017. It comprises the Ramnarain Ruia College of Arts and Science and the Ramnivas Ruia Junior College of Arts and Science.

The college has been awarded a five star rating by the National Assessment and Accreditation Council (NAAC) of India. Also, the NAAC accorded it the A+ Grade and a CGPA of 3.70 out of 4, which is the highest in the state. The college was given the 'Potential for Excellence' status in 2010–11.

Additionally, in 2014, Ruia College was adjudged a 'College of Excellence' by the University Grants Commission, New Delhi, and is the first College in the country to have received this status. Ruia college won the award for the best college given by University of Mumbai for the year 2006. It has been winning the trophy in the youth festival organized by Mumbai University for the last six consecutive years.

== Academics ==
With its varied experience and diligence, the Ruia faculty was in a position to innovate and experiment soon after the college started functioning. Considerable emphasis was placed on development of the instructional program and evaluation procedures. Under several programs, such as COSIP (College Science Improvement Program) and COHSSIP (College Human and Social Science Improvement Program), Ruia has successfully implemented several innovative and experimental academic programs that won wide acclaim.

The senior college library has a large reading hall which accommodates about 400 students and the reading hall in junior college building accommodates about 200 students. Special facilities to borrow books and exam papers are available in these reading halls. The Open Shelf Library is an important unit of the library for Graduate students, with about 30,000 books readily available to students. The sub-sections are well categorized and meticulously laid out, and book selection is such as to be of great use to students specializing in different subjects. The college also provides instructional material on audio and videocassettes to the students through the audio-visual center and AV library.

The Information Technology Center is a fully equipped IT center, with 60 computers for students and 9 specially for staff members; it offers a variety of courses to the students and faculty. The Electronics Laboratory is an electronics lab, with multiple power supplies and a den containing all the necessary components for the students. It is considered one of the best electronic labs in the state.

The Postgraduate Study and Research Center is the only Center of its kind to be established in a college in Mumbai, it provides comfortable accommodation, books, periodicals and bound copies of learned journals to postgraduate and research students. It is housed in the Ruia college library, which has a large collection of about 1,50,000 books, several of which are rare and not available elsewhere.

Another feature that distinguishes the college from others in the state is the Marathi Medium Unit. This unit of the college was launched to tackle a problem faced by several students coming from state board and university students: inability to understand what they are taught in English (medium of instruction) as they have done their schooling in Marathi.

== Co-curricular activities ==
The Vidyarthi Pratinidhi Mandal (VPM) was founded to enable students of the college to be in close touch with the teacher and members of the management, the VPM was constituted as a student body in 1969. It has been highly successful in encouraging in student participation in a variety of co-curricular activities.

Numbering about 20, there are different Co-curricular Associations which enable students with varied interests to participate in intra- and inter-college activities and beyond, to tap their potential to the maximum. Ruia also has an excellent auditorium that can accommodate about 400 students. Another well-equipped 150-seat auditorium, with video projection facilities, has also been set up recently.

The Ruiaite (college magazine) has been published annually since 1937, earning for itself a reputation far beyond the aspirations of most other college magazines. It has won several prestigious awards over the years. The Gymkhana is fully equipped with badminton court, shooting range and highly sophisticated exercising equipment, made available for use by the students and faculty of the college.

Various annual inter-collegiate festivals are organized, which hold a special place in students' hearts. Utsav Aarohan is one such festival. In 2026, KC College emerged as the winner, while H.R. College of Commerce and Economics secured the first runner-up position. Their Contingent Leader, Riyan Chavande, was awarded the Best Contingent Leader Award for 2026.

Apart from those two, various departments have their own festivals, collectively recognized as 'Samanvay'. These provide great opportunities for students to network, showcase their talent and learn from the experience.

== Support for disadvantaged students ==
The Students Mutual Aid Fund (SMAF) was started in 1948 with the intention of helping out those deserving students who required financial assistance. It now extends benefits to the economically disadvantaged students through lunch coupons, paying fees and issuing sets of books on loan. It arranges exhibitions and other programmes to augment its funds.

There is also a Cell for Visually-Challenged Students (known as SVC by the Ruiates) in which the college has provided facilities for the visually challenged, which include Robotron to read for the students, computer to translate as well as give printouts of Braille into English and a computer to talk to these students.

== Courses ==
=== Undergraduate degree courses ===
- Bachelor of Science (BSc) (Statistics, Biochemistry, Mathematics, Physics, Chemistry, Biotechnology, Botany, Zoology, Life Science, Microbiology, Computer Science, Bio-analytical sciences)
- Bachelor of Arts (B.A.) (Economics, Political Science, Philosophy, English Literature, Sanskrit Literature, Hindi Literature, French Literature, Marathi Literature, Psychology, Mathematics & History)
- Bachelor of Mass Media (B.M.M.)

=== Postgraduate courses ===
- Master of Science (MSc) (Zoology, Botany, Chemistry, Biochemistry, Life Sciences, Biotechnology, Microbiology, Bioanalytical Sciences, Computer Science & Information Technology, Herbal Sciences and Physics)
- Doctor of Philosophy (PhD) in Chemistry, Physics, Botany, Zoology, Life Science and History

=== Diploma courses ===
- Diploma in Information Technology
- Diploma in Bioinformatics
- Diploma in Travel and Tourism
- Diploma in Community Radio and Community Media Technology
- Post Graduate Diploma in Industrial Analytical Chemistry.
- Post Graduate Diploma in Public Relations and Communication
- Post Graduate Diploma in Business Journalism

=== Certification courses ===
- Certificate in Soft Skills and Personality Development
- Certificate in Entrepreneurship Development Skills
- Certificate in Heritage of Mumbai
- Certificate in Pharmacovigilance
- Certificate in Introductory Bioanalysis
- Certificate in Child Psychology
- Certificate in Food Science & Quality Control
- Certificate in Films -a language of Politics
- Certificate in Web Development Fundamentals
- Certificate in Aquascaping and Interiorscaping
- Certificate in Organic Gardening

and more

== Notable alumni ==
Some of the notable alumni of the college include:

- Bharati Achrekar – Actress
- Sonali Bendre – Actress and Model
- Ashwini Bhide-Deshpande – Indian Classical Singer
- Swati Chitnis – Indian Classical Singer
- Dilip Chitre – Poet, Critic, Painter and filmmaker
- Lord Meghnad Desai – Economist and politician from Labour Party (UK)
- Hemant Gokhale – a former Judge at the Supreme Court of India, Former Chief Justice of the Madras High Court & Allahabad High Court
- Narendra Jadhav – Economist, Social Scientist, Writer and Educationist; Member, Planning Commission; Former Member of National Advisory Council; Vice-Chancellor of Savitribai Phule Pune University
- Manohar Joshi – 13th Speaker of the Lok Sabha; 12th Chief Minister of Maharashtra; Former Mayor of Mumbai
- Spruha Joshi, actress
- Nissim Kanekar, astrophysicist, Shanti Swarup Bhatnagar Award laureate
- Krishnaswamy Kasturirangan – Former Chairman, ISRO; Member, Planning Commission; Former Member of Parliament
- Isha Koppikar – Actress and Model
- Raju Kulkarni – Former Indian Cricketer
- Ila Arab Mehta, Gujarati novelist
- Nandu Natekar – former National Badminton Champion and the First Indian to win a title abroad, in 1956
- Dilip Walse Patil – Politician, Former Speaker of Maharashtra Legislative Assembly and Former Ministry of Finance (Maharashtra)
- Medha Patkar – Social Activist and Reformer; National Convener of National Alliance of People's Movements (NAPM); Founder Member of the Narmada Bachao Andolan
- Beena Pillai, N-Bios laureate
- Dilip Prabhavalkar – Actor
- Nishikant Kamat - Director, Writer, Actor
- Lalchand Rajput – Former Indian Cricketer
- Kranti Redkar – Actress, director
- Shruti Sadolikar – Indian Classical Singer
- Smita Talwalkar – Actress, Producer, Director
- Sulekha Talwalkar – Actress
- Shilpa Tulaskar – Actress
- Vidyadhar Vyas – Indian Classical Vocalist
- Ajit Wadekar – Former International Cricket Player
- Nikhil Wagle, Journalist
- Sanjay Narvekar, actor
- Hruta Durgule– actress
- Vaidehi Parshurami - Film Actress
- Dwarkanath Sanzgiri, Indian sports writer

== See also ==
- List of Mumbai Colleges
