= Ila Arab Mehta =

Indian Gujarati-language writer (1938–2026)

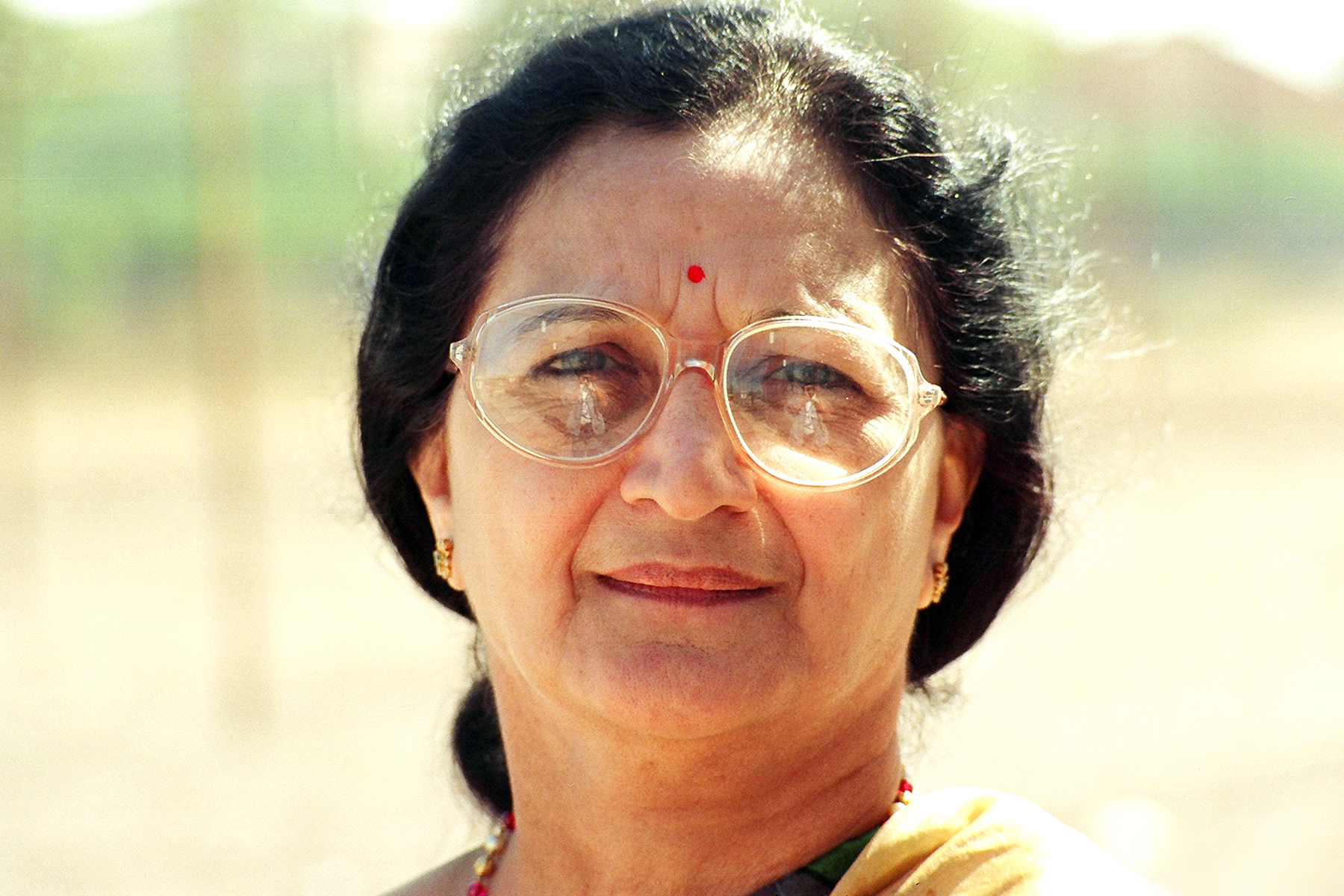
- Ila Arab Mehta in 1995
- Born: 16 June 1938; Bombay, Bombay Province, British India
- Died: 6 October 2026 (aged 88); Mumbai, Maharashtra, India
- Education: B.A., M.A.
- Occupations: Novelist, short-story writer
- Writing career
- Language: Gujarati
- Notable work: Batris Putali ni Vedna

Ila Arab Mehta (16 June 1938 – 6 October 2026) was an Indian Gujarati novelist and story writer from Gujarat.

== Early life and education ==
Mehta was born on 16 June 1938 at Bombay (now Mumbai) to Gujarati writer Gunvantrai Acharya. Her family belonged to Jamnagar. She completed her schooling from Jamnagar, Rajkot and Mumbai. She completed BA with Gujarati in 1958 from Ramnarain Ruia College and MA in 1960.

== Career ==
Mehta taught at Ruia College from 1960 to 1967 and later at St. Xavier's College, Mumbai from 1970 to her retirement in 2000.

In her early days, Mehta wrote in Akhand Anand, Navneet and Stree Jeevan magazines. She has written several novels including Trikonni Tran Rekhao (1966), Thijelo Akar (1970), Radha (1972), Ek Hata Diwan Bahadur (1976), Batris Laksho (1976), Varasdar (1978), Avati Kalno Sooraj (1979), Batris Putalini Vedana (1982), Ane Mrityu (1982), Dariyano Manas (1985), Vasant Chhlake (1987), Nag Pariksha, Panch Pagala Prithvi Par (1995), The New Life (2004), Parpotani Aankh (1988), Zili Me Kumpal Hathelima (2007). Jaherkhabarno MAnas (1985), Shabne Naam Hotu Nathi (1981) are novels with different subjects. Her novel Vaad (2011) is translated in English as Fence (2015) by Rita Kothari. Her novel Batris Putlini Vedna is a story of women's struggle against injustice done to them and their attempt to establish their own identity. It centred around Anuradha, a main protagonist of the novel, and presents her anger against male chauvinism in the same way as Kundanika Kapadia's Saat Paglan Akashman (Seven Steps in the Sky; 1994).

Ek Cigarette Ek Dhupsali (1981), Viena-Woods (1989), Bhagyarekha (1995), Balavo Balvi Balvu (1998), Yom Kippur (2006). Ila Arab Mehtano Varta Vaibhav (2009) are her collections of stories. She has edited Varsha Adaljani Shreshth Vartao (1991), selected stories of Varsha Adalja.

Mrityu Naam Parpota Mare (1984) is her compilation of literary works by various authors on death.

Her writing is considered feminist.

== Awards ==
Mehta was awarded by Gujarat Sahitya Akademi, Maharashtra Gujarati Sahitya Akademi, and Gujarati Sahitya Parishad.

== Personal life and death ==
In 1964, she married Arab Mehta, a doctor, and had a son, Salil and a daughter, Sonali. Mehta lived in Mumbai. Her father Gunvantrai Acharya and her younger sister Varsha Adalja are also Gujarati writers.

Mehta died in Mumbai on 6 October 2026, at the age of 88.
