= Dwarkanath Sanzgiri =

Indian writer and journalist

- Born: 15 November 1950; Mumbai, India
- Died: 6 February 2025 (aged 74); Mumbai, India
- Occupations: Writer, journalist, television presenter

Dwarkanath Sanzgiri (15 November 1950 – 6 February 2025) was an Indian sports journalist, writer and television presenter. He was best known for his cricket writing and analysis, and in a career spanning nearly 50 years worked as a sports columnist for several newspapers and magazines and as an author.

== Early life ==
Sanzgiri was born in Mumbai in the Hindu Colony are of Dadar East. He attended Raja Shivaji Vidyalaya (then known as King George School) and Ramnarain Ruia College in Matunga. He pursued further education in civil engineering from Veermata Jijabai Technological Institute in Matunga.

== Career ==
Sanzgiri's career as a writer began in the second half of the 1970s; he initially wrote for magazines like Dinank and Shree. He was a part of the small contingent of Indian journalists that attended the 1983 Cricket World Cup in person. After that tournament was won by the Indian cricket team, Sanzgiri founded the biweekly Marathi sports magazine Ekach Shatkar with his friends. Sanzgiri served as the magazine's executive editor, while former Indian cricketer Sandeep Patil later served as its editor. Sanzgiri also worked as a cricket analyst for several Marathi newspapers, and hosted several cricket talk shows and felicitations for Indian sportspeople, including retired cricketers. He wrote over 40 books on sports, cinema, travel and social issues, His 2023 book Scintillating Sachin, written on Sachin Tendulkar, was well received.

Besides working as a writer, Sanzgiri was a civil engineer employed with the Brihanmumbai Municipal Corporation, from where he retired in 2008 at the post of Chief Engineer in the water supply department. He was the screenplay writer for the Marathi television serial Madhu Ithe An Chandra Tithe.

== Death ==
Sanzgiri died of cancer in Lilavati Hospital in Bandra, Mumbai on 6 February 2025, after a prolonged illness. He was cremated at the Shivaji Park Crematorium in Dadar on the following day.
