= H2AFV =

Protein-coding gene in the species Homo sapiens

H2AZ2
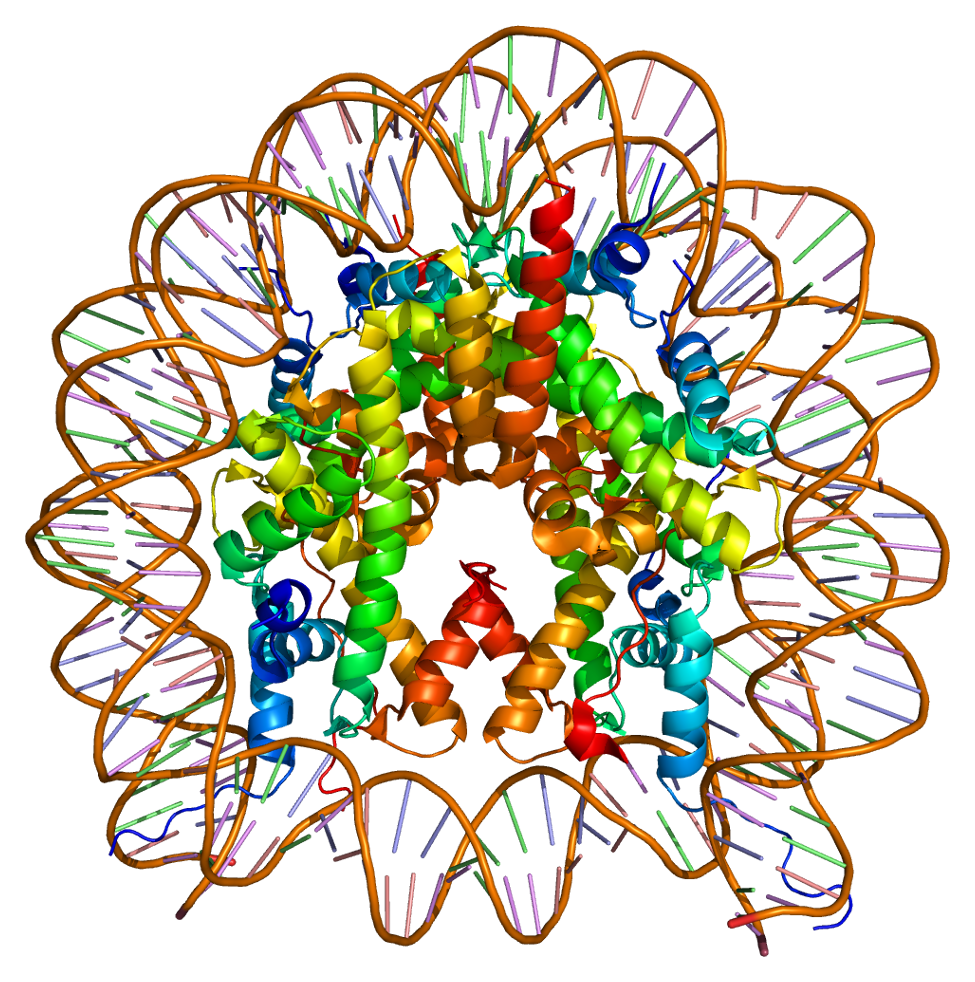

Identifiers
- Aliases: H2AZ2, H2A.Z-2, H2AV, H2A histone family member V, H2A.Z variant histone 2, H2AFV
- External IDs: MGI: 1924855; GeneCards: H2AZ2
Available structures
PDB	Ortholog search: PDBe RCSB
PDB	List of PDB id codes 3WAA

Gene location (Human)
Chr.	Chromosome 7 (human)
Band	7p13	Start	44,826,791 bp
Band	7p13	End	44,848,087 bp

Gene location (Mouse)
Chr.	Chromosome 11 (mouse)
Band	11|11 A1	Start	6,377,229 bp
Band	11|11 A1	End	6,394,443 bp
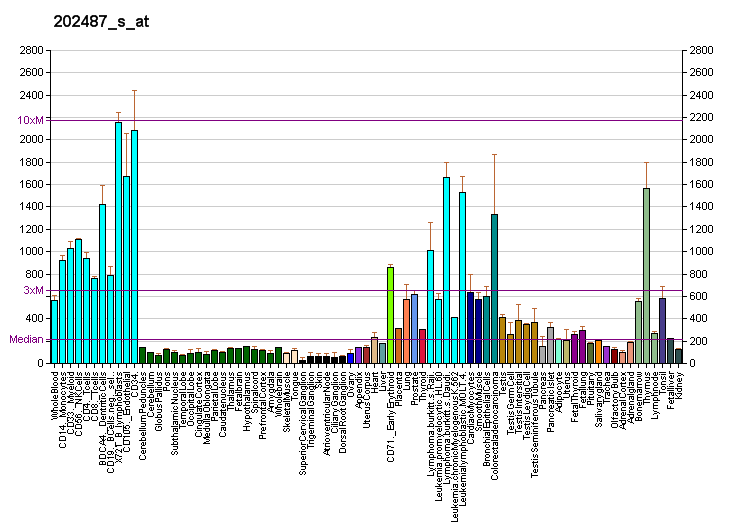

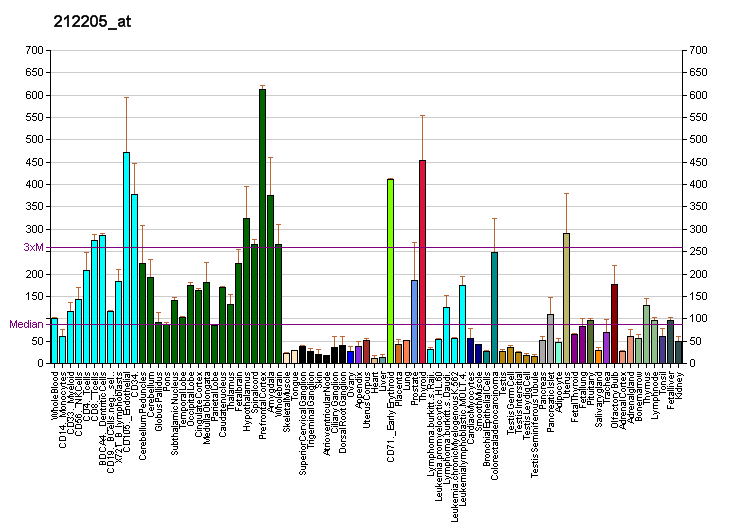

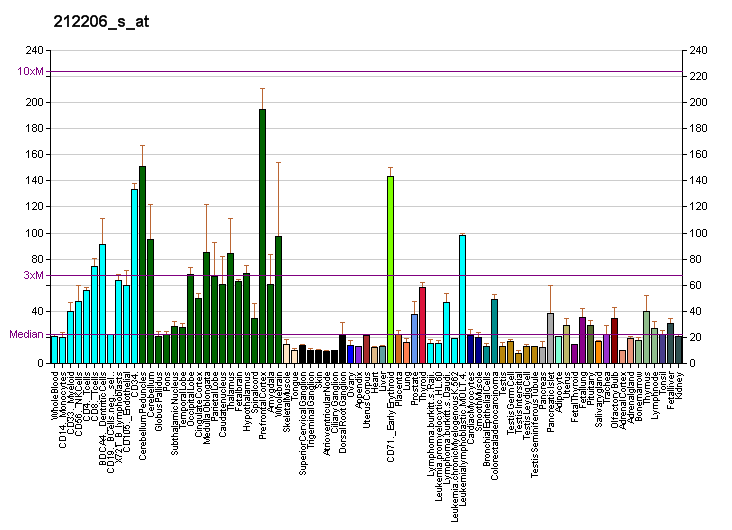
RNA expression pattern
Bgee	Human / Mouse (ortholog); Top expressed in: ventricular zone; ganglionic eminence; optic nerve; rectum; mucosa of transverse colon; right ventricle; epithelium of colon; endothelial cell; left ventricle; Achilles tendon / Top expressed in: Ileal epithelium; medial ganglionic eminence; ventricular zone; maxillary prominence; mandibular prominence; endocardial cushion; abdominal wall; somite; migratory enteric neural crest cell; thymus; More reference expression data
BioGPS	More reference expression data
Gene ontology
Molecular function	DNA binding; protein heterodimerization activity; molecular function
Cellular component	nucleosome; extracellular exosome; nucleus; chromosome
Biological process	chromatin organization; biological process
Sources:Amigo / QuickGO
Orthologs
Databases	NCBI: entry; OMA: entry
Species	Human	Mouse
Entrez	94239	77605
Ensembl	ENSG00000105968	ENSMUSG00000041126
UniProt	Q71UI9	Q3THW5
RefSeq (mRNA)	NM_201517; NM_012412; NM_138635; NM_201436; NM_201516	NM_029938; NM_001347064
RefSeq (protein)	NP_036544; NP_619541; NP_958844; NP_958924; NP_958925	NP_001333993; NP_084214
Location (UCSC)	Chr 7: 44.83 – 44.85 Mb	Chr 11: 6.38 – 6.39 Mb
PubMed search
- Wikidata
View/Edit Human	View/Edit Mouse

Histone H2A.V is a protein that in humans is encoded by the H2AFV gene.

Histones are basic nuclear proteins that are responsible for the nucleosome structure of the chromosomal fiber in eukaryotes. Nucleosomes consist of approximately 146 bp of DNA wrapped around a histone octamer composed of pairs of each of the four core histones (H2A, H2B, H3, and H4). The chromatin fiber is further compacted through the interaction of a linker histone, H1, with the DNA between the nucleosomes to form higher order chromatin structures. This gene encodes a member of the histone H2A family. Several transcripts have been identified for this gene.
