= Histone-like DNA-binding protein =

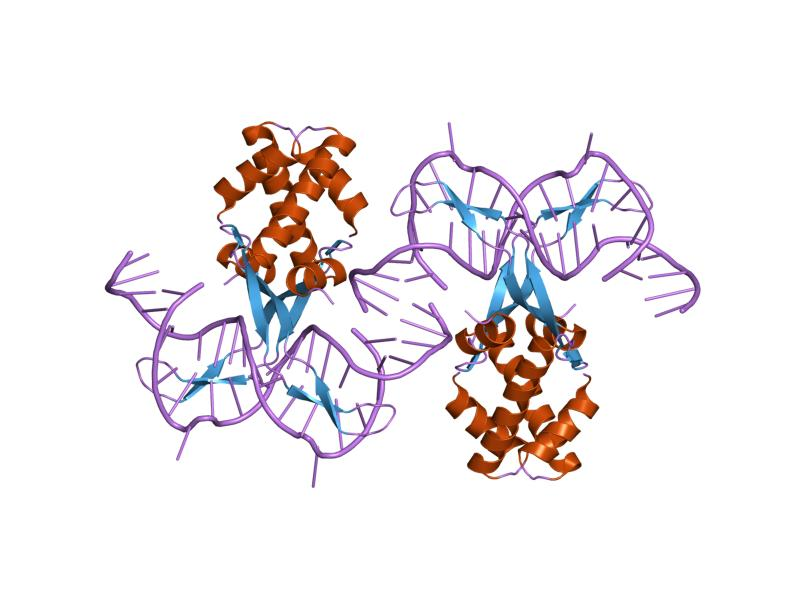
- anabaena hu-dna cocrystal structure (ahu6)

Identifiers
- Symbol: Bac_DNA_binding
- Pfam: PF00216
- InterPro: IPR000119
- PROSITE: PDOC00044
- SCOP2: 1hue / SCOPe / SUPFAM
- CDD: cd00591
Available protein structures:
- PDB: IPR000119 PF00216 (ECOD; PDBsum)
- AlphaFold: IPR000119; PF00216

In molecular biology, histone-like DNA-binding proteins (HU) are a family of small, usually basic proteins of about 90 residues that bind DNA.

This family is also found in a group of eukaryotes known as dinoflagellates. These dinoflagellate histone-like proteins replace histone in some dinoflagellates and package DNA into a liquid-crystalline state.

== History ==
Histone-like proteins are present in many Eubacteria, Cyanobacteria, and Archaebacteria. These proteins participate in all DNA-dependent functions; in these processes, bacterial DNA binding proteins have an architectural role, maintaining structural integrity as transcription, recombination, replication, or any other DNA-dependent process proceeds. Eukaryotic histones were first discovered through experiments in 0.4M NaCl. In these high salt concentrations, the eukaryotic histone protein is eluted from a DNA solution in which single stranded DNA is bound covalently to cellulose. Following elution, the protein readily binds DNA, indicating the protein's high affinity for DNA. Histone-like proteins were unknown to be present in bacteria until similarities between eukaryotic histones and the HU-protein were noted, particularly because of the abundancy, basicity, and small size of both of the proteins. Upon further investigation, it was discovered that the amino acid composition of HU resembles that of eukaryotic histones, thus prompting further research into the exact function of bacterial DNA binding proteins and discoveries of other related proteins in bacteria.

== Structure ==
HU is a small (10 kDa) bacterial DNA-binding protein, which structurally differs from a eukaryotic histone but functionally acts similarly to a histone by inducing negative supercoiling into circular DNA with the assistance of topoisomerase. The protein has been implicated in DNA replication, recombination, and repair. With an α-helical hydrophobic core and two positively charged β-ribbon arms, HU binds non-specifically to dsDNA with low affinity but binds to altered DNA—such as junctions, nicks, gaps, forks, and overhangs—with high affinity. The arms bind to the minor groove of DNA in low affinity states; in high affinity states, a component of the α-helical core interacts with the DNA as well. However, this protein's function is not solely confined to DNA; HU also binds to RNA and DNA-RNA hybrids with the same affinity as supercoiled DNA.

== Function ==
Recent research has revealed that HU binds with high specificity to the mRNA of rpoS, a transcript for the stress sigma factor of RNA polymerase, and stimulates translation of the protein. Additional to this RNA function, it was also demonstrated that HU binds DsrA, a small non-coding RNA that regulates transcription through repressing H-NS and stimulates translation through increasing expression of rpoS. These interactions suggest that HU has multiple influences on transcription and translation in bacterial cells.

== See also ==
- DNA-binding domain
- DNA-binding protein
- DNA-binding protein from starved cells
- Transcription factor
