= H2AFY2 =

Protein-coding gene in humans

MACROH2A2

Identifiers
- Aliases: MACROH2A2, macroH2A2, H2A histone family member Y2, H2AFY2, macroH2A.2 histone
- External IDs: OMIM: 616141; MGI: 3037658; GeneCards: MACROH2A2
Available structures
PDB	Ortholog search: PDBe RCSB
PDB	List of PDB id codes 2XD7

Gene location (Human)
Chr.	Chromosome 10 (human)
Band	10q22.1	Start	70,052,544 bp
Band	10q22.1	End	70,112,282 bp

Gene location (Mouse)
Chr.	Chromosome 10 (mouse)
Band	10|10 B4	Start	61,574,444 bp
Band	10|10 B4	End	61,619,926 bp
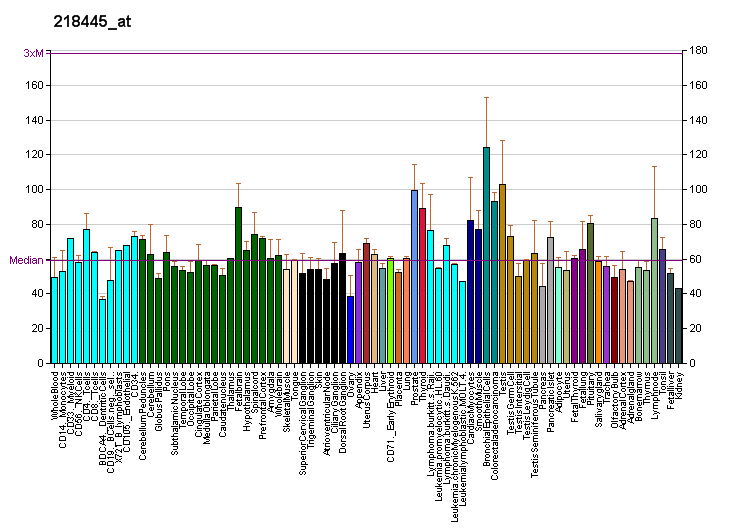
RNA expression pattern
Bgee	Human / Mouse (ortholog); Top expressed in: ganglionic eminence; ventricular zone; epithelium of colon; gingival epithelium; cerebellar vermis; pancreatic epithelial cell; islet of Langerhans; epithelium of esophagus; hair follicle; cerebellar hemisphere / Top expressed in: genital tubercle; tail of embryo; neural tube; ventricular zone; maxillary prominence; ganglionic eminence; mandibular prominence; medial ganglionic eminence; otic placode; abdominal wall; More reference expression data
BioGPS	More reference expression data
Gene ontology
Molecular function	DNA binding; RNA polymerase II transcription regulatory region sequence-specific DNA binding; protein heterodimerization activity; chromatin DNA binding
Cellular component	ESC/E(Z) complex; nucleoplasm; chromosome; nucleosome; chromatin; extracellular exosome; Barr body; nucleus
Biological process	nucleosome assembly; negative regulation of transcription of nucleolar large rRNA by RNA polymerase I; positive regulation of keratinocyte differentiation; dosage compensation; negative regulation of transcription by RNA polymerase II; establishment of protein localization to chromatin; brain development; negative regulation of gene expression, epigenetic; regulation of cell growth; chromatin organization
Sources:Amigo / QuickGO
Orthologs
Databases	NCBI: entry; OMA: entry
Species	Human	Mouse
Entrez	55506	404634
Ensembl	ENSG00000099284	ENSMUSG00000020086
UniProt	Q9P0M6	Q8CCK0
RefSeq (mRNA)	NM_018649	NM_207000
RefSeq (protein)	NP_061119	NP_996883
Location (UCSC)	Chr 10: 70.05 – 70.11 Mb	Chr 10: 61.57 – 61.62 Mb
PubMed search
- Wikidata
View/Edit Human	View/Edit Mouse

Core histone macro-H2A.2 is a protein that in humans is encoded by the H2AFY2 gene.
