= H2AFB3 =

Protein-coding gene in the species Homo sapiens

H2AB3

Identifiers
- Aliases: H2AB3, H2ABBD, H2AFB, H2A histone family member B3, H2A.B variant histone 3, H2AFB3, H2AB2, H2A.B.1
- External IDs: OMIM: 300445; MGI: 3644980; GeneCards: H2AB3

Gene location (Human)
Chr.	X chromosome (human)
Band	Xq28	Start	155,459,415 bp
Band	Xq28	End	155,460,005 bp

Gene location (Mouse)
Chr.	X chromosome (mouse)
Band	X|X E1	Start	115,590,875 bp
Band	X|X E1	End	115,591,222 bp
RNA expression pattern
Bgee	Human / Mouse (ortholog); Top expressed in: gonad; right coronary artery; right testis; right ovary; left uterine tube; spleen; blood; gastric mucosa; canal of the cervix; duodenum / Top expressed in: spleen; thymus; dentate gyrus of hippocampal formation granule cell; lung; More reference expression data
BioGPS	n/a
Gene ontology
Molecular function	protein heterodimerization activity; DNA binding
Cellular component	nucleosome; nucleus; chromosome
Biological process	nucleosome assembly; mRNA processing; chromatin organization
Sources:Amigo / QuickGO
Orthologs
Databases	NCBI: entry; OMA: entry
Species	Human	Mouse
Entrez	83740	624153
Ensembl	ENSG00000277745	ENSMUSG00000082482
UniProt	P0C5Z0	S4R1M3
RefSeq (mRNA)	NM_080720	NM_001281530
RefSeq (protein)	NP_001017991	NP_001268459
Location (UCSC)	Chr X: 155.46 – 155.46 Mb	Chr X: 115.59 – 115.59 Mb
PubMed search
- Wikidata
View/Edit Human	View/Edit Mouse

H2A histone family, member B3 is a protein that in humans is encoded by the H2AFB3 gene.

Histones are basic nuclear proteins that are responsible for the nucleosome structure of the chromosomal fiber in eukaryotes. Nucleosomes consist of approximately 146 bp of DNA wrapped around a histone octamer composed of pairs of each of the four core histones (H2A, H2B, H3, and H4). The chromatin fiber is further compacted through the interaction of a linker histone, H1, with the DNA between the nucleosomes to form higher order chromatin structures. This gene encodes a member of the histone H2A family. This gene is part of a region that is repeated three times on chromosome X, once in intron 22 of the F8 gene and twice closer to the Xq telomere. This record represents the most telomeric copy. [provided by RefSeq, Jul 2008].
