= Linker histone H1 variants =

Protein family which binds DNA wrapped around the core in a nucleosome

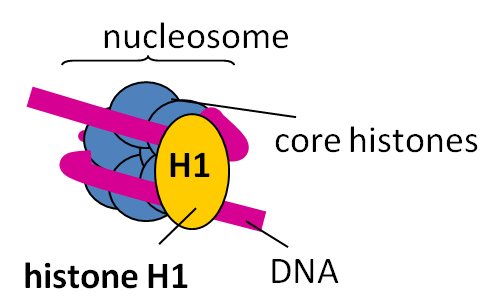
Diagram showing the linker histone H1 binding to the nucleosome

In molecular biology, the linker histone H1 is a protein family forming a critical component of eukaryotic chromatin. H1 histones bind to the linker DNA exiting from the nucleosome core particle, while the core histones (H2A, H2B, H3 and H4) form the octamer core of the nucleosome around which the DNA is wrapped.

H1 forms a complex family of related proteins with distinct specificity for tissues, developmental stages, and organisms in which they are expressed. Individual H1 proteins are often referred to as isoforms or variants.

The discovery of H1 variants in calf thymus preceded the discovery of core histone variants.

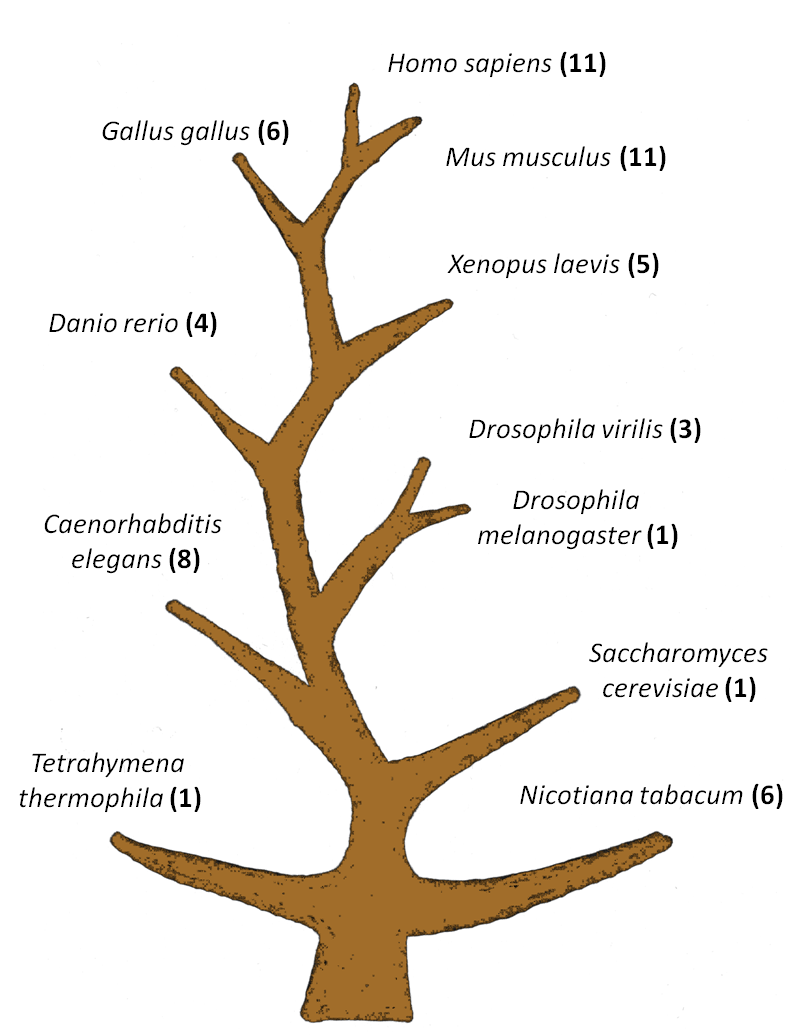
Evolutionary tree of eukaryotes showing in brackets the number of known linker histone H1 variants in a given species (see original data in)

== Human linker histone variants ==
In human and mouse cells 11 H1 variants have been described and are encoded by single genes. Six of the variants are mainly expressed during the S phase and hence replication-dependent. They are encoded by genes within histone cluster 1 located in human cells on chromosome 6. The five further variants are expressed over the whole cell cycle and their encoding genes are scattered in the genome.

Human gene symbol	Unified phylogeny-based nomenclature
H1 variants within histone gene cluster 1 (replication dependent)
HIST1H1A	H1.1
HIST1H1B	H1.5
HIST1H1C	H1.2
HIST1H1D	H1.3
HIST1H1E	H1.4
HIST1H1T	(TS) H1.6
H1 variants encoded by orphan genes (replication independent)
H1F0	H1.0
H1FNT	(TS) H1.7
H1FOO	(OO) H1.8
HILS1	(TS) H1.9
H1FX	H1.10

TS - testis specific, OO - oocyte specific variants

== Evolution ==
Histone H1 differs strongly from the core histones. Rather than originating from archaeal histones, it probably evolved from a bacterial protein. Unlike core histones featuring a so-called histone fold, H1s typically have a short basic N-terminal domain, a globular domain and a lysine-rich C-terminal domain (the N- and C-termini are also referred to as tails). H1s are also less conserved than the core histones. The mammalian H1 isoforms are paralogs, which means their encoding genes originated from gene duplication events. The corresponding H1 variants in two different species, such as human and mouse H1.4 are orthologs – they had a common ancestor gene and were separated by speciation. Within one species, the paralogous H1 variants show a high conservation of the globular core domain, while the N- and C-termini are more divergent. At the same time H1 orthologs among mammals are highly conserved across the whole protein sequence, for example human and mouse H1.4 share 93.6% sequence identity.

== Function ==
The extent to which individual H1 variants can be redundant and what their distinct functions are isn't yet clear. The fact that many individual H1 variant knockouts in mice are viable and show compensation by other H1 variants seems to support the hypothesis of redundancy. However, many lines of evidence suggest specific functions exist for H1 variants. For example, individual H1 variant knockout mice reveal specific phenotypes and distinct effects on gene expression and chromatin structure. Also, different isotypes show different localization and bind to chromatin with different affinities.

Therefore, a model has been proposed according to which H1 variants have two distinct roles, a common and a specific one: Individual H1 proteins are redundant in their ability to compact chromatin globally and to stabilize overall higher order chromatin structures. Such a common role can therefore be compensated in mutant cells by increasing the amount of other H1 variants. However, at the level of local chromatin organization, individual variants can regulate a subset of specific genes both in a negative and positive way.

== Nomenclature ==
Multiple nomenclatures (around 12) for linker histone variants have been proposed and used in publications previously, greatly complicating comparison across studies. In 1994 Parseghian et al. have attempted to create a system in which variant designations were applied uniformly to orthologs across mammalian species, however this nomenclature hasn't been taken up by other laboratories. In 2012, a diverse group of scientists from multiple institutions across the world working on different aspects of histone biology proposed a unified phylogeny-based nomenclature for histone variants, including H1 histones, with the aim of producing informative and easily searchable histone variant names.

== See also ==
- histone H1
- histone
- nucleosome
- chromatin
