= Histone H4 =

One of the five main histone proteins involved in the structure of chromatin

H4 histone, family 3
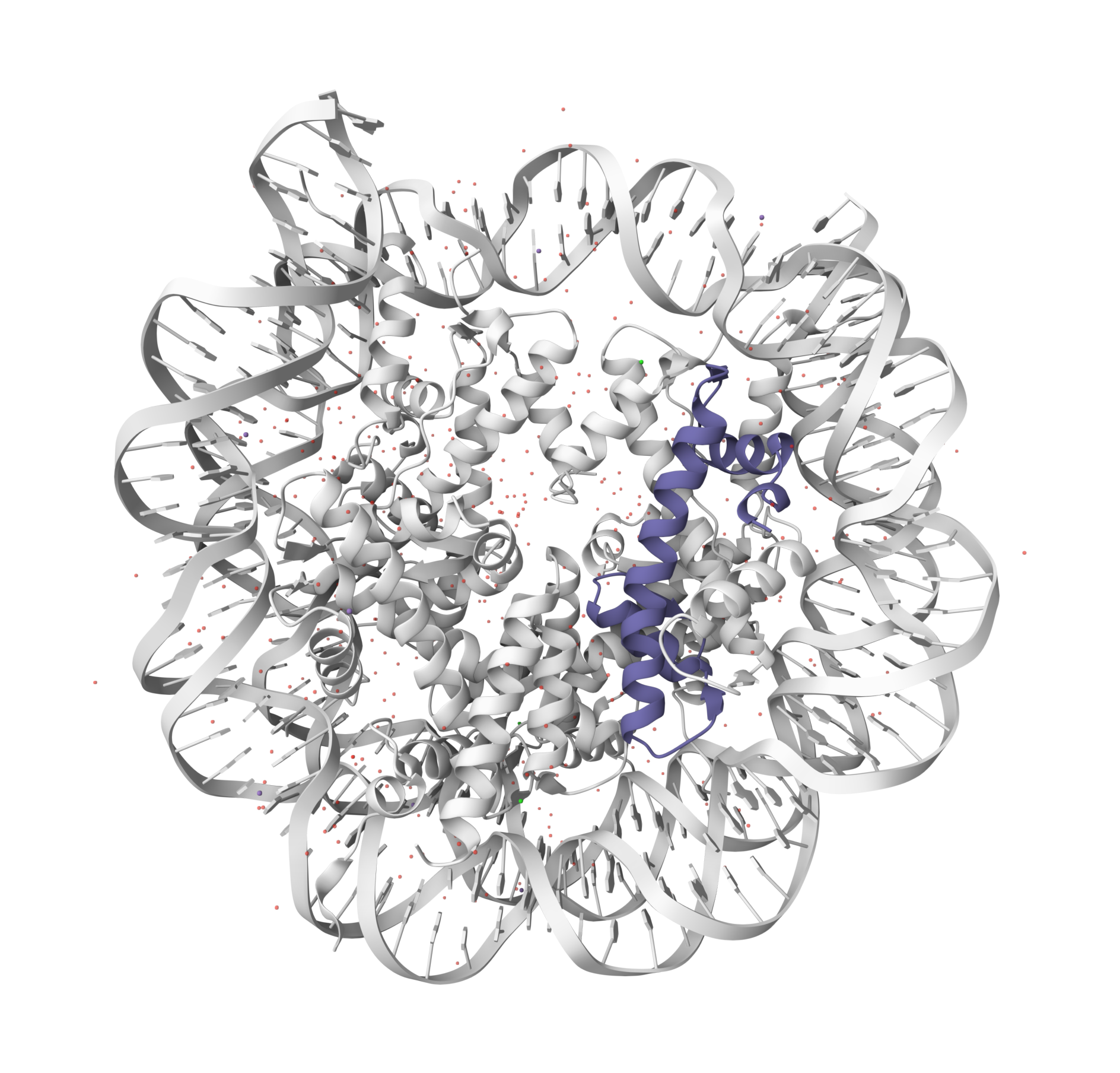
- Histone H4 (blue) within the human nucleosome (grey)

Identifiers
- Symbol: H4F3
- NCBI gene: 3023
- HGNC: 4780
- UniProt: P62805

Other data
- Locus: Chr. 3 q13.13
Search for
- Structures: Swiss-model
- Domains: InterPro

Basic units of chromatin structure

Histone H4 is one of the five main histone proteins involved in the structure of chromatin in eukaryotic cells. Featuring a main globular domain and a long N-terminal tail, H4 is involved with the structure of the nucleosome of the 'beads on a string' organization. Histone proteins are highly post-translationally modified. Covalently bonded modifications include acetylation and methylation of the N-terminal tails. These modifications may alter expression of genes located on DNA associated with its parent histone octamer. Histone H4 is an important protein in the structure and function of chromatin, where its sequence variants and variable modification states are thought to play a role in the dynamic and long term regulation of genes.

== Genetics ==
Histone H4 is encoded in multiple genes at different loci including: HIST1H4A, HIST1H4B, HIST1H4C, HIST1H4D, HIST1H4E, HIST1H4F, HIST1H4G, HIST1H4H, HIST1H4I, HIST1H4J, HIST1H4K, HIST1H4L, HIST2H4A, HIST2H4B, HIST4H4.

== Evolution ==
Histone proteins are among the most highly conserved eukaryotic proteins. For example, the amino acid sequence of histone H4 from a pea and cow differ at only 2 out of the 102 positions. This evolutionary conservation suggests that the functions of histone proteins involve nearly all of their amino acids so that any change is deleterious to the cell. Most changes in histone sequences are lethal; the few that are not lethal cause changes in the pattern of gene expression as well as other abnormalities.

== Structure ==
Histone H4 is a 102 to 135 amino acid protein which shares a structural motif, known as the histone fold, formed from three a-helices connected by two loops. Histone proteins H3 and H4 bind to form a H3-H4 dimer, two of these H3-H4 dimers combine to form a tetramer. This tetramer further combines with two H2a-H2b dimers to form the compact Histone octamer core.

== Sequence variants ==
Histone H4 is one of the slowest evolving proteins. There are H4 genes that are constitutively expressed throughout the cell cycle that encode for proteins that are identical in sequence to the major H4. Variants in human histone H4 were only recently discovered and are very rare.

Pathogenic de novo missense variants have been identified in six H4 genes (HIST1H4C, HIST1H4D, HIST1H4E, HIST1H4F, HIST1H4I, HIST1H4J) in 33 individuals total, all presenting with neurodevelopmental features of intellectual disability and motor and/or gross developmental delay, but with variable non-neurological features. Ten amino acids were affected, six of which were found recurrently. These mutations were located within either the H4 core globular domain (involved in protein-protein interaction) or C-terminal tail (involved in post-translational modification).

== Alternative translation ==
The Osteogenic Growth Peptide (OGP) is a 14-aa peptide produced from alternative translation of histone H4 mRNA, sharing the C-terminal sequence ALKRQGRTLYGFGG of histone H4. Translation is initiated at the 85th amino acid of the histone H4 mRNA, resulting in a 19-aa peptide (preOGP). This is converted into OGP through the cleavage of 5 amino-terminal residues. It is found in human and rat circulation as well as regenerating bone marrow. In blood serum it is bound to α2M along with two other binding proteins that are not clearly identified. A specific receptor has not been identified, but some signaling pathways involved in its bone-regenaration function has been elucidated.

== Post-translational modifications ==
Eukaryotic organisms can produce small amounts of specialized variant core histones that differ in amino acid sequence from the main ones. These variants with a variety of covalent modifications on the N-terminal can be added to histones making possible different chromatin structures that are required for DNA function in higher eukaryotes. Potential modifications include methylation (mono-, di-, or tri-methylation) or acetylation on the tails.

=== Methylation ===
Histone methylation occurs on arginine, lysine and histidine amino acids residues. Mono-, di- or tri-methylation has been discovered on histone H2A, H3 and H4. Histone methylation has been associated with various cellular functions such as transcription, DNA replication, and DNA damage response including repair, heterochromatin formation, and somatic cell reprogramming. Among these biological functions, transcriptional repression and activation are the most studied. Studies have shown that H4R3 methylation by PRMT1 (a histone methyltransferase) appears to be essential in vivo for the establishment or maintenance of a wide range of “active” chromatin modifications. Also methylation of histone H4 by PRMT1 was sufficient to permit subsequent acetylation on the N-terminal tail. However, acetylation of H4 inhibits its methylation by PRMT1.

=== Acetylation ===
Acetylation of histones is thought to relax condensed heterochromatin as the negative charge of acetyl groups can repel the DNA phosphate backbone charges, thus reducing the histone binding affinity for DNA. This hypothesis was validated by the discovery of the histone acetyltransferase (HAT) activity of several transcriptional activator complexes. Histone acetylation influences chromatin structure in several ways. First, it can provide a tag for the binding of proteins that contain areas which recognize the acetylated tails. Secondly, it can block the function of chromatin remodelers. Thirdly, it neutralizes the positive charge on lysines. Acetylation of histone H4 on lysine 16 (H4K16ac) is especially important for chromatin structure and function in a variety of eukaryotes and is catalyzed by specific histone lysine acetyltransferases (HATs). H4K16 can influence the formation of a compact higher-order chromatin structure. Hypoacetylation of H4K16 appears to cause delayed recruitment of DNA repair proteins to sites of DNA damage in a mouse model of the premature aging syndrome Hutchinson Gilford progeria. H4K16Ac also has roles in transcriptional activation and the maintenance of euchromatin. Additional acetylations include K31ac and K79ac.

== List of H4 modifications ==
H4S1p

H4R3me2

H4K5ac

H4K8ac

H4K12ac

H4K16ac

H4K16adp

H4K20me

H4K31ac

H4S47o-p

H4K79ac

H4K91ac

H4K91ub

== See also ==
- Histone code#Histone H4

== See also ==
- nucleosome
- histone
- chromatin
- Other histone proteins involved in chromatin:

- H1
- H2A
- H2B
- H3
