= Epigenetics of plant growth and development =

Field of study

The epigenetics of plant growth and development refers to the heritable changes in gene expression that occur without alterations to the DNA sequence, influencing processes in plants such as seed germination, flowering, and stress responses through mechanisms like DNA methylation, histone modification, and chromatin remodeling.

Plants depend on epigenetic processes (mechanisms that regulate gene activity and expression without changing the underlying DNA sequence) for proper function. The area of study examines protein interactions with DNA and its associated components, including histones and various other modifications such as methylation, which alter the rate or target of transcription. Epi-alleles and epi-mutants, much like their genetic counterparts, describe changes in phenotypes due to epigenetic mechanisms. Epigenetics in plants has attracted scientific enthusiasm because of its importance in agriculture.

== History ==
In the past, macroscopic observations on plants led to a basic understanding of how plants respond to their environments and grow. While these investigations could somewhat correlate cause and effect as a plant develops, they could not truly explain the mechanisms at work without inspection at the molecular level.

Certain studies provided simplistic models with the groundwork for further exploration and eventual explanation through epigenetics. In 1918, Gustav Gassner published findings that noted the necessity of a cold phase for proper plant growth. Meanwhile, Garner and Allard examined the importance of the duration of light exposure to plant growth in 1920. Gassner's work would shape the conceptualization of vernalization, which involves epigenetic changes in plants after a period of cold that leads to the development of flowering. In a similar manner, Garner and Allard's efforts would gather an awareness of photoperiodism which involves epigenetic modifications following the duration of nighttime which enable flowering. Rudimentary comprehensions set precedent for later molecular evaluation and, eventually, a more complete view of how plants operate.

Modern epigenetic work depends heavily on bioinformatics to gather large quantities of data relating the function of elements such as intensive looks at DNA sequences or patterns in DNA modifications. With improved methods, flowering mechanisms including vernalization and photoperiodism, Flowering Wageningen, and the underlying processes controlling germination, meristematic tissue, and heterosis have been explained through epigenetics.

Research on plants looks at several species. These species are apparently selected on the basis of either conventional model organisms status, such as Arabidopsis with its manageability in lab and a known genome, or relevance in agronomy, such as rice, barley or tomatoes.

== Epigenetics ==
Epigenetic modifications regulate gene expression. The transcription of DNA into RNA and subsequent translation into proteins determines the form and function of all living things. The level of DNA transcription generally depends on how accessible DNA is to transcription factors. Many epigenetic changes occur either on histones, which are normally associated with DNA in chromatin, or directly on the DNA. For instance, methylation of DNA leads to transcriptional silencing by denying access to transcription factors. Histone methylation can lead to either silencing or activation as determined by the amino acid marked. Meanwhile, histone acetylation typically lessens the hold of histones on DNA by reducing positive charge, resulting in facilitation of transcription.

=== Polycomb and trithorax group proteins ===
Polycomb group (PcG) proteins and trithorax groups (TrxG) proteins act as key regulators of gene expression through histone lysine methylation. PcG proteins repress target genes via Histone 3 lysine 27 trimethylation (H3K27me3), whereas TrxG proteins activate gene expression via histone 3 lysine 4 trimethylation (H3K4me3).

=== Long non-coding RNA ===
Long non-coding RNA can associate with DNA in tandem with proteins to alter the rate of gene expression. These RNA are upwards of 200 base pairs. They can be transcribed from a standalone sequence or be part of a promoter, intron or other component of DNA. Long non-coding RNA often complement functional regions of DNA with overlaps or antisense. To direct transcriptional silencing, a non-coding RNA will associate with a polycomb group protein which to tether it to a specific gene for silencing.

== Seed dormancy and germination ==
Germination is the early growth of a plant from a seed. Meanwhile, dormancy precedes germination and serves to preserve a seed until conditions are receptive towards growth. The transition from dormancy to germination seems to depend on the removal of factors inhibiting growth. There are many models for germination which may differ between species. The activity of genes such as Delay of Germination and presence of hormones such as gibberelins have been implicated in dormancy while the exact mechanisms surrounding their action is unknown.

=== Deacetylation ===
There are at least eighteen histone deacetylases in Arabidopsis. Genome-wide association mapping has shown that deacetylation of histones by Histone Deacetylase 2B negatively affects dormancy. The remodeling of chromatin by histone deacetylase leads to silencing of genes that control plant hormones such as ethylene, abscisic acid, and gibberelin which maintain dormancy. Additionally, Histone Deacetylase A6 and A19 activity contributes to silencing of Cytochrome P450 707A and activation of 9-cis-epoxycarotenoid dioxygenase. Both of these actions lead to increased abscisic acid.

=== Methylaltion ===
Methylation by the methyltransferase KRYPTONITE causes histone H3 lysine 9 dimethylation which recruits the DNA methyltransferase CHROMOMETHTLASE3 in tandem with HETEROCHROMATIN PROTEIN1. This association methylates cytosine for a stable silencing of Delay of Germination 1 and ABA Insensitive Genes which both contribute to dormancy.

== Flowering and related mechanisms ==
Flowering is a pivotal step in plant development. Numerous epigenetic factors contribute to the regulation of flowering genes, known as flowering loci (FL). In Arabidopsis, flowering locus t is responsible for the production of florigen, which induces Turck_2008 in the shoot apical meristem, a special set of growth tissues, to establish flowering. Homologs of the flowering genes exist in flowering plants, but the exact nature of how the genes respond to each mechanism might differ between species.

=== Vernalization ===
Vernalization depends on the presence of a long non-coding RNA that is termed COLDAIR. The exposure of plants to a significant period of cold results in COLDAIR accumulation. COLDAIR targets polycomb repressive complex 2 which acts to silence flowering locus C through methylation. As flowering locus C is repressed it no longer acts to inhibit the transcription of flowering locus t and SOC1. Flowering locus t and SOC1 activity leads to the development of flowers.

=== Photoperiodism ===
Another set of flowering controls stems from photoperiodism which initiates flowering based on the length of nighttime. Long day plants flower with a short night, while short day plants require uninterrupted darkness. Some plants are restricted to either condition, while others can operate under a combination of the two, and some plants do not operate under photoperiodism. In Arabidopsis, the gene CONSTANS responds to long day conditions and enables flowering when it stops repressing flowering locus t. In rice, photoperiodic response is slightly more complex and is controlled by the florigen genes Rice Flowering locus T 1 (RFT1) and Heading date 3 a (Hd3a). Hd3a, is a homolog of flowering locus t and, when no longer repressed, activates flowering by directing modification of DNA at the shoot apical meristem with florigen. Heading date 1 (Hd1) is a gene that promotes flowering under short day conditions but represses flowering under long day as it either activates or suppresses Hd3a. Meanwhile, RFT1 can cause flowering under non-inductive long day. Polycomb Repressive Complex 2 can lead to silencing of the genes through histone H3 lysine 27 trimethylation. A variety of chromatin modifications operating in both long and short days or only under one condition can also affect the two florigen genes in rice.

== Flowering wageningen (FWA) ==
The gene FWA has been identified as responsible for late flowering in epi-mutants. Epi-mutants are individuals with particular epigenetic changes that lead to a distinct phenotype. As such, both wild type and epi-mutant variants contain identical sequences for FWA. Loss of methylation in direct repeats in the 5' region of the gene results in expression of FWA and subsequent prevention of proper flowering. The gene is normally silenced by methylation of DNA in tissues not related to flowering (Soppe et al. 2000).

== Meristematic tissue ==
Meristematic tissues contain cells that continue to grow and differentiate throughout the plant's lifetime. Shoot apical meristem gives rise to flowers and leaves while root apical meristem grows into roots. These components are crucial to general plant growth and are the harbingers of development. Meristematic tissue apparently contains characteristic epigenetic modifications. For example, the boundary between the proximal meristem and elongation zone showed elevated H4K5ac along with a high level of 5mC in barley. Root meristematic tissues have been found to contain patterns for histone H4 lysine 5 acetylation, histone H3 lysine 4 and 9 di methylation and DNA methylation as 5-methyl cytosine. So far, only a causal correlation between epigenetic marks and tissue types has been established and further study is required to understand the exact involvement of the marks.

== Heterosis ==
Heterosis is defined as any advantages seen in hybrids. The effects of heterosis seem to follow a rather simple epigenetic premise in plants. In hybrids, lack of proper regulatory action, such as silencing by methylation, leads to uninhibited genes. If the gene is involved in growth, such as photosynthesis, the plant will experience increased vitality.

The results heterosis can be seen in traits such as increased fruit yield, earlier ripening, and heat tolerance. Heterosis has been shown to provide increased general growth and fruit yield in tomato plants.
