= NCED =

NCED may refer to:

- National Center for Earth-surface Dynamics
- 9-cis-epoxycarotenoid dioxygenase, an enzyme
- National Center for Employee Development, a personnel training center owned USPS, and operated by Aramark. NCED is near the public campus located in Norman, Oklahoma
