= Photoperiodism =

Responses of organisms to the relative lengths of light and dark periods

Photoperiod is the change of day length over the seasons. Earth's rotation around its axis produces 24-hour changes in light (daytime) and dark (night) cycles on Earth. The length of the light and dark in each phase varies across the seasons due to the axial tilt of Earth. The photoperiod defines the length of the light. For example, in summer the length of light could be 16 hours while the dark is 8 hours, whereas in winter the length of day could be 8 hours, while the dark is 16 hours. Importantly, the axial tilt of the Earth causes the opposing seasons in the Northern and Southern Hemispheres.

Photoperiodism is the physiological reaction of organisms to the length of light or a dark period. It occurs in plants and animals. Plant photoperiodism can also be defined as the developmental responses of plants to the relative lengths of light and dark periods. They are classified into three groups according to the photoperiods: short-day plants, long-day plants, and day-neutral plants.

In animals, photoperiodism (sometimes called seasonality) is the suite of physiological changes that occur in response to changes in day length. This allows animals to respond to a temporally changing environment associated with changing seasons as the earth orbits the sun.

== Plants ==
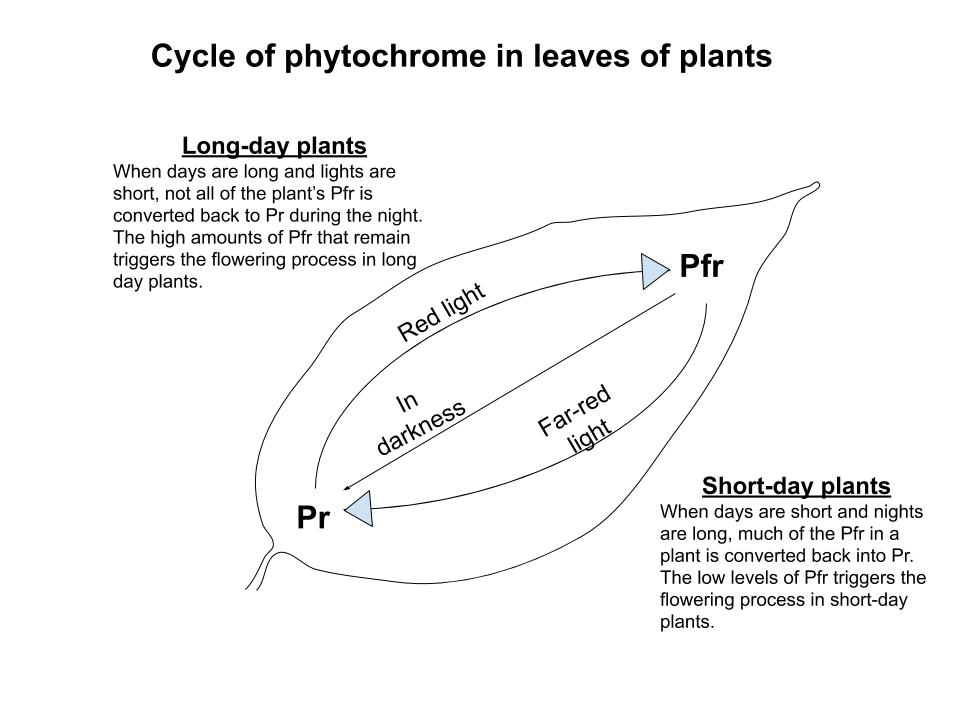
Pr converts to Pfr during the day time and Pfr slowly reverts to Pr during the night time. When nights are short, an excess amount of Pfr remains in the day time and during long nights, most of the Pfr is reverted to Pr.

In 1920, W. W. Garner and H. A. Allard published their discoveries on photoperiodism and felt it was the length of daylight that was critical, but it was later discovered that the length of the night was the controlling factor. Photoperiodic flowering plants are classified as long-day plants or short-day plants even though night is the critical factor because of the initial misunderstanding about daylight being the controlling factor. Along with long-day plants and short-day plants, there are plants that fall into a "dual-day length category". These plants are either long-short-day plants (LSDP) or short-long-day plants (SLDP). LSDPs flower after a series of long days followed by short days whereas SLDPs flower after a series of short days followed by long days. Each plant has a different length critical photoperiod, or critical night length.

Many flowering plants (angiosperms) use a circadian rhythm together with photoreceptor protein, such as phytochrome or cryptochrome, to sense seasonal changes in night length, or photoperiod, which they take as signals to flower. In a further subdivision, obligate photoperiodic plants absolutely require a long or short enough night before flowering, whereas facultative photoperiodic plants are more likely to flower under one condition.

Phytochrome comes in two forms: P_{r} and P_{fr}. Red light (which is present during the day) converts phytochrome to its active form (P_{fr}) which then stimulates various processes such as germination, flowering or branching. In comparison, plants receive more far-red in the shade, and this converts phytochrome from P_{fr} to its inactive form, P_{r}, inhibiting germination. This system of P_{fr} to P_{r} conversion allows the plant to sense when it is night and when it is day. P_{fr} can also be converted back to P_{r} by a process known as dark reversion, where long periods of darkness trigger the conversion of P_{fr}. This is important in regards to plant flowering. Experiments by Halliday et al. showed that manipulations of the red-to far-red ratio in Arabidopsis can alter flowering. They discovered that plants tend to flower later when exposed to more red light, proving that red light is inhibitory to flowering. Other experiments have proven this by exposing plants to extra red-light in the middle of the night. A short-day plant will not flower if light is turned on for a few minutes in the middle of the night and a long-day plant can flower if exposed to more red-light in the middle of the night.

Cryptochromes are another type of photoreceptor that is important in photoperiodism. Cryptochromes absorb blue light and UV-A. Cryptochromes entrain the circadian clock to light. It has been found that both cryptochrome and phytochrome abundance rely on light and the amount of cryptochrome can change depending on day-length. This shows how important both of the photoreceptors are in regard to determining day-length.

Modern biologists believe that it is the coincidence of the active forms of phytochrome or cryptochrome, created by light during the daytime, with the rhythms of the circadian clock that allows plants to measure the length of the night. Other than flowering, photoperiodism in plants includes the growth of stems or roots during certain seasons and the loss of leaves. Artificial lighting can be used to induce extra-long days.

== Plants ==
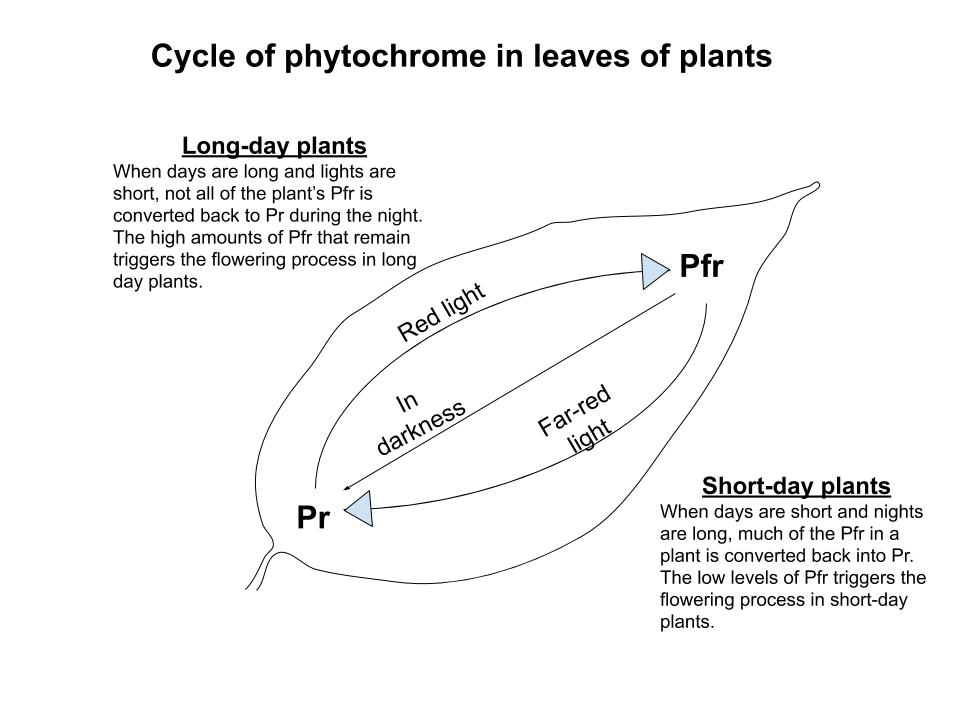
Pr converts to Pfr during the day time and Pfr slowly reverts to Pr during the night time. When nights are short, an excess amount of Pfr remains in the day time and during long nights, most of the Pfr is reverted to Pr.

In 1920, W. W. Garner and H. A. Allard published their discoveries on photoperiodism and felt it was the length of daylight that was critical, but it was later discovered that the length of the night was the controlling factor. Photoperiodic flowering plants are classified as long-day plants or short-day plants even though night is the critical factor because of the initial misunderstanding about daylight being the controlling factor. Along with long-day plants and short-day plants, there are plants that fall into a "dual-day length category". These plants are either long-short-day plants (LSDP) or short-long-day plants (SLDP). LSDPs flower after a series of long days followed by short days whereas SLDPs flower after a series of short days followed by long days. Each plant has a different length critical photoperiod, or critical night length.

Many flowering plants (angiosperms) use a circadian rhythm together with photoreceptor protein, such as phytochrome or cryptochrome, to sense seasonal changes in night length, or photoperiod, which they take as signals to flower. In a further subdivision, obligate photoperiodic plants absolutely require a long or short enough night before flowering, whereas facultative photoperiodic plants are more likely to flower under one condition.

Phytochrome comes in two forms: P_{r} and P_{fr}. Red light (which is present during the day) converts phytochrome to its active form (P_{fr}) which then stimulates various processes such as germination, flowering or branching. In comparison, plants receive more far-red in the shade, and this converts phytochrome from P_{fr} to its inactive form, P_{r}, inhibiting germination. This system of P_{fr} to P_{r} conversion allows the plant to sense when it is night and when it is day. P_{fr} can also be converted back to P_{r} by a process known as dark reversion, where long periods of darkness trigger the conversion of P_{fr}. This is important in regards to plant flowering. Experiments by Halliday et al. showed that manipulations of the red-to far-red ratio in Arabidopsis can alter flowering. They discovered that plants tend to flower later when exposed to more red light, proving that red light is inhibitory to flowering. Other experiments have proven this by exposing plants to extra red-light in the middle of the night. A short-day plant will not flower if light is turned on for a few minutes in the middle of the night and a long-day plant can flower if exposed to more red-light in the middle of the night.

Cryptochromes are another type of photoreceptor that is important in photoperiodism. Cryptochromes absorb blue light and UV-A. Cryptochromes entrain the circadian clock to light. It has been found that both cryptochrome and phytochrome abundance relies on light and the amount of cryptochrome can change depending on day-length. This shows how important both of the photoreceptors are in regards to determining day-length.

Modern biologists believe that it is the coincidence of the active forms of phytochrome or cryptochrome, created by light during the daytime, with the rhythms of the circadian clock that allows plants to measure the length of the night. Other than flowering, photoperiodism in plants includes the growth of stems or roots during certain seasons and the loss of leaves. Artificial lighting can be used to induce extra-long days.

=== Long-day plants ===
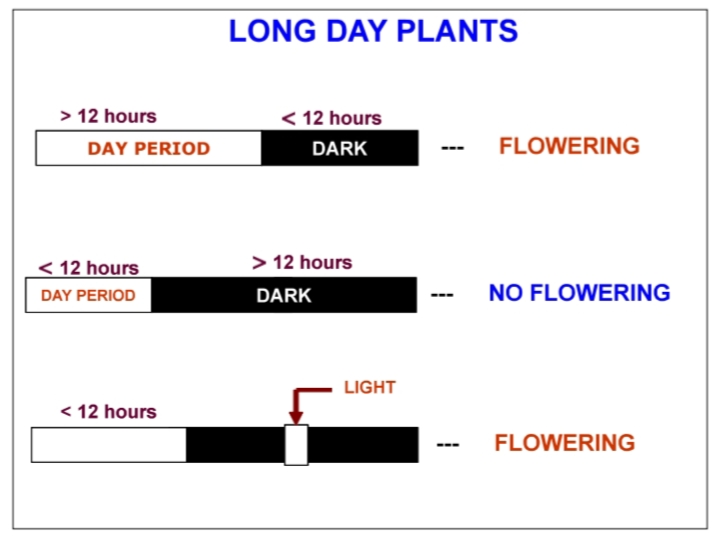

Long-day plants flower when the night length falls below their critical photoperiod. These plants typically flower during late spring or early summer as days are getting longer. In the northern hemisphere, the longest day of the year (summer solstice) is on or about 21 June. After that date, days grow shorter (i.e. nights grow longer) until 21 December (the winter solstice). This situation is reversed in the southern hemisphere (i.e., longest day is 21 December and shortest day is 21 June).

Some long-day obligate plants are:

- Carnation (Dianthus)
- Henbane (Hyoscyamus)
- Oat (Avena)

Some long-day facultative plants are:

- Pea (Pisum sativum)
- Barley (Hordeum vulgare)
- Lettuce (Lactuca sativa)
- Wheat (Triticum aestivum)

=== Short-day plants ===
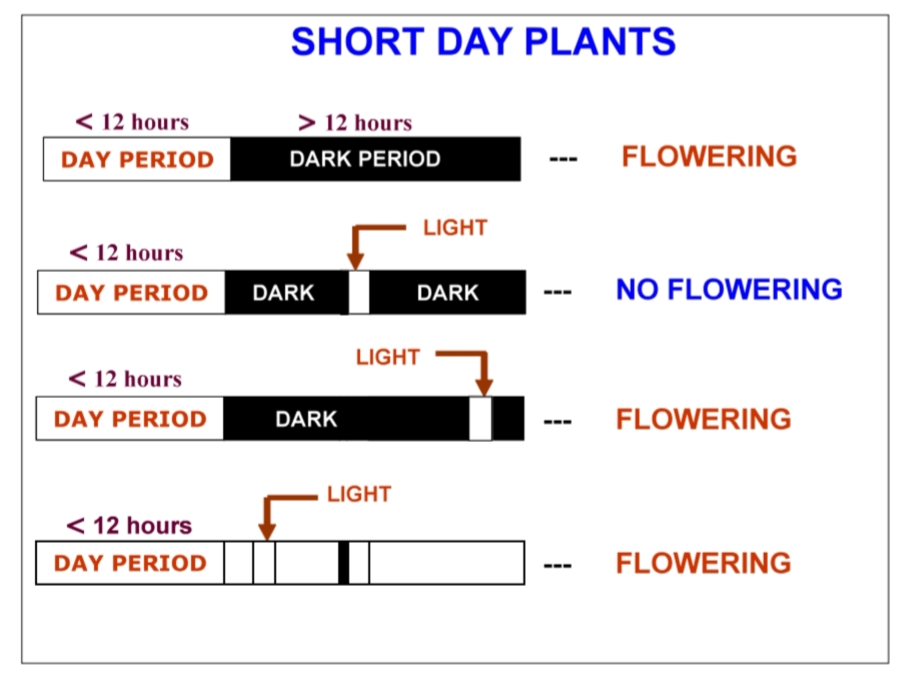

Short-day (also called long-night) plants flower when the night lengths exceed their critical photoperiod. They cannot flower under short nights or if a pulse of artificial light is shone on the plant for several minutes during the night; They require a continuous period of darkness before floral development can begin. Natural nighttime light, such as moonlight or lightning, is not of sufficient brightness or duration to interrupt flowering.

Short-day plants flower as days grow shorter (and nights grow longer) after 21 September in the northern hemisphere, which is during summer or fall. The length of the dark period required to induce flowering differs among species and varieties of a species.

Photoperiodism affects flowering by inducing the shoot to produce floral buds instead of leaves and lateral buds.

Some short-day facultative plants are:

- Kenaf (Hibiscus cannabinus)
- Marijuana (Cannabis)
- Cotton (Gossypium)
- Rice (Oryza)
- Sorghum (Sorghum bicolor)
- Green gram (Mung bean, Vigna radiata)
- Soybeans (Glycine max)

=== Day-neutral plants ===
Day-neutral plants, such as cucumbers, roses, tomatoes, and Ruderalis (autoflowering cannabis) do not initiate flowering based on photoperiodism. Instead, they may initiate flowering after attaining a certain overall developmental stage or age, or in response to alternative environmental stimuli, such as vernalisation (a period of low temperature).

== Animals ==
Day length, and thus knowledge of the season of the year, is vital to many animals. A number of biological and behavioural changes are dependent on this knowledge. Together with temperature changes, photoperiod provokes changes in the color of fur and feathers, migration, entry into hibernation, sexual behaviour, and even the resizing of organs.

In insects, sensitivity to photoperiod has been proven to be initiated by photoreceptors located in the brain. Photoperiod can affect insects at different life stages, serving as an environmental cue for physiological processes such as diapause induction and termination, and seasonal morphs. In the water strider Aquarius paludum, for instance, photoperiod conditions during nymphal development have been shown to trigger seasonal changes in wing frequency and also induce diapause, although the threshold critical day lengths for the determination of both traits diverged by about an hour. In Gerris buenoi, another water strider species, photoperiod has also been shown to be the cause of wing polyphenism, although the specific day lengths changed between species, suggesting that phenotypic plasticity in response to photoperiod has evolved even between relatively closely related species.

The singing frequency of birds such as the canary depends on the photoperiod. In the spring, when the photoperiod increases (more daylight), the male canary's testes grow. As the testes grow, more androgens are secreted and song frequency increases. During autumn, when the photoperiod decreases (less daylight), the male canary's testes regress and androgen levels drop dramatically, resulting in decreased singing frequency. Not only is singing frequency dependent on the photoperiod but the song repertoire is also. The long photoperiod of spring results in a greater song repertoire. Autumn's shorter photoperiod results in a reduction in song repertoire. These behavioral photoperiod changes in male canaries are caused by changes in the song center of the brain. As the photoperiod increases, the high vocal center (HVC) and the robust nucleus of the archistriatum (RA) increase in size. When the photoperiod decreases, these areas of the brain regress.

== Mammals ==
In mammals, day length is registered in the suprachiasmatic nucleus (SCN), which is informed by retinal light-sensitive ganglion cells, which are not involved in vision. The information travels through the retinohypothalamic tract (RHT). In most species the hormone melatonin is produced by the pineal gland only during the hours of darkness, influenced by the light input through the RHT and by innate circadian rhythms. This hormonal signal, combined with outputs from the SCN inform the rest of the body about the time of day, and the length of time that melatonin is secreted is how the time of year is perceived.

Many mammals, particularly those inhabiting temperate and polar regions, exhibit a remarkable degree of seasonality in response to changes in daylight hours(photoperiod). This seasonality manifests in a broad spectrum of behaviors and physiology, including hibernation, seasonal migrations, and coat color changes. A prime example of the adaptation to photoperiods is the seasonal coat color (SCC) species. These animals undergo molting, transforming from dark summer fur to white coat in winter, that provides crucial camouflage in snowy environments.

=== Humans ===
The view has been expressed that humans' seasonality is largely believed to be evolutionary baggage.. Human birth rate varies throughout the year, and the peak month of births appears to vary by latitude. Seasonality in human birth rate appears to have largely decreased since the industrial revolution.

== Other organisms ==
Photoperiodism has also been demonstrated in other organisms besides plants and animals. The fungus Neurospora crassa as well as the dinoflagellate Lingulodinium polyedra and the unicellular green alga Chlamydomonas reinhardtii have been shown to display photoperiodic responses.

== See also ==
- Chronobiology
- Circadian clock
- Circadian rhythm
- Florigen
- Photobiology
- Seasonal Breeder
- Scotobiology
- Epigenetics of plant growth and development § Photoperiodism
