= H4K20me =

Histone methylation on tail of histone H4

H4K20me is an epigenetic modification to the DNA packaging protein Histone H4. It is a mark that indicates the methylation at the 20th lysine residue of the histone H4 protein. This mark can be mono-, di-, or tri-methylated. It is critical for genome integrity including DNA damage repair, DNA replication and chromatin compaction.

H4K20me2 is the most common methylation state on histone H4 and was one of the earliest modified histone residues to be identified back in pea and calf extracts in 1969. It is one of only two identified methylated lysine residues on the H4 histone, the other being monomethylated H4K12.

Each degree of methylation at H4K20 has a very different cellular process. The loss of H4K20me3 along with a reduction of H4K16ac is a strong indicator of cancer.

== Nomenclature ==
H4K20me indicates monomethylation of lysine 20 on histone H4 protein subunit:

Abbr.	Meaning
H4	H4 family of histones
K	standard abbreviation for lysine
20	position of amino acid residue (counting from N-terminus)
me	methyl group
1	number of methyl groups added

== Lysine methylation ==

This diagram shows the progressive methylation of a lysine residue. The mono-methylation (second from left) denotes the methylation present in H4K20me.

H4K20me exists in three distinct states as mono-, di- and trimethylation.

=== H4K20me1 ===
H4K20me1 is associated with transcriptional activation.

=== H4K20me2 ===
H4K20me2 is similar to H4K20me1 but has a different distribution and this dimethylation controls the cell cycle and DNA damage response.

=== H4K20me3 ===
H4K20me3 is very different. H4K20me3 represses transcription when present at promoters. H4K20me3 also silences repetitive DNA and transposons. The loss of H4K20me3 defines cancer along with a reduction of H4K16ac.

H4K20me3 is involved in Hutchinson-Gilford Progeria syndrome where patients have premature and very rapid aging caused by de novo mutations that occurs in a gene that encodes lamin A. Lamin A is made but isn't processed properly. This poor processing creates a really abnormal nuclear morphology and disorganized heterochromatin. Patients also don't have appropriate DNA repair, and they also have increased genomic instability.

== Cancer marker ==
The loss of the repressive H4K20me3 mark defines cancer along with a reduction of activating H4K16ac mark. It is not clear how the loss of a repressive and an activating mark is an indicator of cancer. It is not clear exactly how but this reduction happens at repetitive sequences along with general reduced DNA methylation.

== Histone modifications ==
The genomic DNA of eukaryotic cells is wrapped around special protein molecules known as histones. The complexes formed by the looping of the DNA are known as chromatin. The basic structural unit of chromatin is the nucleosome: this consists of the core octamer of histones (H2A, H2B, H3 and H4) as well as a linker histone and about 180 base pairs of DNA. These core histones are rich in lysine and arginine residues. The carboxyl (C) terminal end of these histones contribute to histone-histone interactions, as well as histone-DNA interactions. The amino (N) terminal charged tails are the site of the post-translational modifications, such as the one seen in H3K36me3.

== Epigenetic implications ==
The post-translational modification of histone tails by either histone modifying complexes or chromatin remodelling complexes are interpreted by the cell and lead to complex, combinatorial transcriptional output. It is thought that a Histone code dictates the expression of genes by a complex interaction between the histones in a particular region. The current understanding and interpretation of histones comes from two large scale projects: ENCODE and the Epigenomic roadmap. The purpose of the epigenomic study was to investigate epigenetic changes across the entire genome. This led to chromatin states which define genomic regions by grouping the interactions of different proteins and/or histone modifications together. Chromatin states were investigated in Drosophila cells by looking at the binding location of proteins in the genome. Use of ChIP-sequencing revealed regions in the genome characterised by different banding. Different developmental stages were profiled in Drosophila as well, an emphasis was placed on histone modification relevance. A look in to the data obtained led to the definition of chromatin states based on histone modifications.

The human genome was annotated with chromatin states. These annotated states can be used as new ways to annotate a genome independently of the underlying genome sequence. This independence from the DNA sequence enforces the epigenetic nature of histone modifications. Chromatin states are also useful in identifying regulatory elements that have no defined sequence, such as enhancers. This additional level of annotation allows for a deeper understanding of cell specific gene regulation.

== History ==
H4K20 was one of the earliest modified histone residues to be identified back in pea and calf extracts in 1969.

== Genome integrity ==
H4K20me is important for DNA damage repair, DNA replication and chromatin compaction.

There are a set of H4K20-specific histone methyltransferases (SET8/PR-Set7, SUV4-20H1 and SUV4-20H2). Without these enzymes there is a disruption of genomic instability.

== Methods ==
The histone mark H4K20me can be detected in a variety of ways:

1. Chromatin Immunoprecipitation Sequencing (ChIP-sequencing) measures the amount of DNA enrichment once bound to a targeted protein and immunoprecipitated. It results in good optimization and is used in vivo to reveal DNA-protein binding occurring in cells. ChIP-Seq can be used to identify and quantify various DNA fragments for different histone modifications along a genomic region.

2. Micrococcal Nuclease sequencing (MNase-seq) is used to investigate regions that are bound by well positioned nucleosomes. Use of the micrococcal nuclease enzyme is employed to identify nucleosome positioning. Well positioned nucleosomes are seen to have enrichment of sequences.

3. Assay for transposase accessible chromatin sequencing (ATAC-seq) is used to look in to regions that are nucleosome free (open chromatin). It uses hyperactive Tn5 transposon to highlight nucleosome localisation.

== See also ==
- Histone methylation
- Histone methyltransferase
- Methyllysine
