= Florigen =

Flowering hormone in plants

Florigens (or flowering hormone) are proteins capable of inducing flowering time in angiosperms. The prototypical florigen is encoded by the FT gene and its orthologs in Arabidopsis and other plants. Florigens are produced in the leaves, and act in the shoot apical meristem of buds and growing tips.

== Mechanism ==
For a plant to begin flowering, it must undergo changes in its shoot apical meristem (SAM). However, there are multiple environmental factors affecting the plant even before it begins this process — in particular, light. It is through "the evolution of both internal and external control systems that enables plants to precisely regulate flowering so that it occurs at the optimal time for reproductive success." The way the plant determines this optimal time is through day-night periods through the use of photoperiodism. Although it was originally thought that the accumulation of photosynthetic products controlled the flowering of plants, two men by the names of Wightman Garner and Henry Allard proved it was not. They instead found that it was a matter of day length rather than the accumulation of the products within the plants that affected their flowering abilities.

Flowering plants fall into two main photoperiodic response categories:

1. "Short-day plants (SDPs) flower only in short days (qualitative SDPs), or their flowering is accelerated by short days (quantitative SDPs)"
2. "Long-day plants (LDPs) flower only in long days (qualitative LDPs), or their flowering is accelerated by long days (quantitative LDPs)"

These types of flowering plants are differentiated by the whether the day has exceeded some duration - usually calculated by 24-hour cycles - known as the critical day length. It is also important to note that there is no absolute value for the minimum day length as it varies greatly amid species. Until the correct amount of day length is reached, the plants ensure no flowering results. They do so through adaptations like preventing immature plants from responding to inadequate day lengths. Plants also have the ability to prevent the response of the photoperiodic stimulus until a certain temperature is reached. Species like winter wheat that rely on just that. The wheat require a cold period before being able to respond to the photoperiod. This is known as vernalization or overwintering.

This ebb-and-flow of flowering in plants is essentially controlled by an internal clock known as the endogenous oscillator. It is thought that these internal pacemakers "are regulated by the interaction of four sets of genes expressed in the dawn, morning, afternoon, and evening hours [and that] light may augment the amplitude of the oscillations by activating the morning and evening genes." The rhythms between these different genes are generated internally in the plants, starts with the leaves, but requires an environmental stimulus such as light. The light essentially stimulates the transmission of a floral stimulus (florigen) to the shoot apex when the correct amount of day-length is perceived. This process is known as photoperiodic induction and is a photoperiod-regulated process that is also dependent on the endogenous oscillator..

The current model suggests the involvement of multiple different factors. Research into florigen is predominately centred on the model organism and long day plant, Arabidopsis thaliana. Whilst much of the florigen pathways appear to be well conserved in other studied species, variations do exist. The mechanism may be broken down into three stages: photoperiod-regulated initiation, signal translocation via the phloem, and induction of flowering at the shoot apical meristem.

=== Initiation ===
In Arabidopsis thaliana, the signal is initiated by the production of messenger RNA (mRNA) coding a transcription factor called CONSTANS (CO). CO mRNA is produced approximately 12 hours after dawn, a cycle regulated by the plant's circadian rhythms, and is then translated into CO protein. However CO protein is stable only in light, so levels stay low throughout short days and are only able to peak at dusk during long days when there is still some light. CO protein promotes transcription of another gene called Flowering Locus T (FT). By this mechanism, CO protein may only reach levels capable of promoting FT transcription when exposed to long days. Hence, the transmission of florigen—and thus, the induction of flowering—relies on a comparison between the plant's perception of day/night and its own internal biological clock.

=== Translocation ===
The FT protein resulting from the short period of CO transcription factor activity is then transported via the phloem to the shoot apical meristem.

=== Flowering ===
Florigen is a systemically mobile signal that is synthesized in leaves and the transported via the phloem to the shoot apical meristem (SAM) where it initiates flowering. In Arabidopsis, the FLOWERING LOCUS T (FT) genes encode for the flowering hormone and in rice the hormone is encoded by Hd3a genes thereby making these genes orthologs. It was found though the use of transgenic plants that the Hd3a promoter in rice is located in the phloem of the leaf along with the Hd3a mRNA. However, the Hd3a protein is found in neither of these places but instead accumulates in the SAM which shows that Hd3a protein is first translated in leaves and then transported to the SAM via the phloem where floral transition is initiated; the same results occurred when looked at Arabidopsis. These results conclude that FT/Hd3a is the florigen signal that induces floral transition in plants.

Upon this conclusion, it became important to understand the process by which the FT protein causes floral transition once it reaches the SAM. The first clue came with looking at models from Arabidposis which suggested that a bZIP domain containing transcription factor, FD, is somehow interacting with FT to form a transcriptional complex that activates floral genes. Studies using rice found that there is an interaction between Hd3a and OsFD1, homologs of FT and FD respectively, that is mediated by the 14-3-3 protein GF14c. The 14-3-3 protein acts as intracellular florigen receptor that interacts directly with Hd3a and OsFD1 to form a tri-protein complex called the florigen activation complex (FAC) because it is essential for florigen function. The FAC works to activate genes needed to initiate flowering at the SAM; flowering genes in Arabidopsis include AP1, SOC1 and several SPL genes, which are targeted by a microRNA and in rice the flowering gene is OsMADS15 (a homolog of AP1).

=== Antiflorigen ===
Florigen is regulated by the action of an antiflorigen. Antiflorigens are hormones that are encoded by the same genes for florigen that work to counteract its function. The antiflorigen in Arabidopsis is TERMINAL FLOWER1 (TFL1) and in tomato it is SELF PRUNING (SP).

== Research history ==
Florigen was first described by Soviet Armenian plant physiologist Mikhail Chailakhyan, who in 1937 demonstrated that floral induction can be transmitted through a graft from an induced plant to one that has not been induced to flower. Anton Lang showed that several long-day plants and biennials could be made to flower by treatment with gibberellin, even when grown under a non-flower-inducing (or non-inducing) photoperiod. This led to the suggestion that florigen may be made up of two classes of flowering hormones: Gibberellins and Anthesins. It was later postulated that during non-inducing photoperiods, long-day plants produce anthesin, but no gibberellin, while short-day plants produce gibberellin, but no anthesin. However, these findings did not account for the fact that short-day plants grown under non-inducing conditions (thus producing gibberellin) will not cause flowering of grafted long-day plants that are also under noninductive conditions (thus producing anthesin).

As a result of the problems with isolating florigen, and of the inconsistent results acquired, it has been suggested that florigen does not exist as an individual substance; rather, florigen's effect could be the result of a particular ratio of other hormones. However, more recent findings indicate that florigen does exist and is produced, or at least activated, in the leaves of the plant and that this signal is then transported via the phloem to the growing tip at the shoot apical meristem where the signal acts by inducing flowering. In Arabidopsis thaliana, some researchers have identified this signal as mRNA coded by the FLOWERING LOCUS T (FT) gene, others as the resulting FT protein. First report of FT mRNA being the signal transducer that moves from leaf to shoot apex came from the publication in Science Magazine. However, in 2007 other group of scientists made a breakthrough saying that it is not the mRNA, but the FT Protein that is transmitted from leaves to shoot possibly acting as "Florigen". The initial article that described FT mRNA as flowering stimuli was retracted by the authors themselves.

== Triggers of gene transcription ==
There are three genes involved in clock-controlled flowering pathway, GIGANTEA (GI), CONSTANS (CO), and FLOWERING LOCUS T (FT). Constant overexpression of GI from the Cauliflower mosaic virus 35S promoter causes early flowering under short day so an increase in GI mRNA expression induces flowering. Also, GI increases the expression of FT and CO mRNA, and FT and CO mutants showed later flowering time than GI mutant. In other words, functional FT and CO genes are required for flowering under short day. In addition, these flowering genes accumulate during light phase and decline during dark phase, which are measured by green fluorescent protein. Thus, their expressions oscillate during the 24-hour light-dark-cycle. In conclusion, the accumulation of GI mRNA alone or GI, FT, and CO mRNA promote flowering in Arabidopsis thaliana and these genes expressed in the temporal sequence GI-CO-FT.

Action potential triggers calcium flux into neurons in animal or root apex cells in plants. The intracellular calcium signals are responsible for regulation of many biological functions in organisms. For instance, Ca^{2+} binding to calmodulin, a Ca^{2+}-binding protein in animals and plants, controls gene transcriptions.

== Flowering mechanism ==
A biological mechanism is proposed based on the information we have above. Light is the flowering signal of Arabidopsis thaliana. Light activates photo-receptors and triggers signal cascades in plant cells of apical or lateral meristems. Action potential is spread via the phloem to the root and more voltage-gated calcium channels are opened along the stem. This causes an influx of calcium ions in the plant. These ions bind to calmodulin and the Ca^{2+}/CaM signaling system triggers the expression of GI mRNA or FT and CO mRNA. The accumulation of GI mRNA or GI-CO-FT mRNA during the day causing the plant to flower.
