= Anton Lang (biologist) =

American biologist (1913–1996)

Anton Lang (January 18, 1913 – June 24, 1996) was a Russian-born American biologist and a plant physiologist.

== Biography ==
He was born in Saint Petersburg, his father was Georgiy Lang, a prominent Russian scientist and founding father of modern therapeutic therapies.

He graduated from the University of Berlin in 1939, majoring in botany. After that, he is working as scientific assistant of Georg Melchers at the Kaiser Wilhelm Institute in Berlin-Dahlem. The cooperation between Anton Lang and Georg Melchers proved extremely fruitful and continued at the Max Planck Institute in Tübingen until 1949, when Anton, his wife Lydia, and his mother emigrated to North America.

He was the recipient of a Lady Davis fellowship in the genetics department of McGill University, then a visiting professor at Texas A&M University. In the fall of 1950 Anton moved to Caltech, where he became a research fellow with James Bonner. In 1952 Anton accepted a faculty position in the botany department at UCLA. In 1959 Anton moved from UCLA back to Caltech, this time as professor of biology and director of the Earhart Plant Research Laboratory. In 1964 the Atomic Energy Commission decided to build the Plant Research Laboratory at Michigan State University, and Anton was named its first director. He retired in 1983.

Lang was notable, among other things, for a discovery of a new method of forcing a bloom in flowers. Michigan State University established a memorial award in Lang's name - The Anton Lang Memorial Award. Lang was a member of the National Academy of Sciences, a member of the American Academy of Arts and Sciences, the founding director of the Plant Research Laboratory at the Michigan State University, the managing editor of Planta, president of the Society for Developmental Biology, and president of the American Society of Plant Physiologists. Among notable awards Lang received the Stephen Hales Award and the Charles Barnes Life Membership Award of the American Society of Plant Physiologists. In 1965, Anton was elected to the German Academy of Natural Scientists (Leopoldina). In 1981 he received an honorary doctorate from the University of Glasgow, and in 1982 he was awarded an honorary membership by the German Botanical Society.

Anton Lang is a grand uncle of Joseph Brodsky's only son Andrei.
