= HIST1H4D =

Protein-coding gene in the species Homo sapiens

H4C4

Identifiers
- Aliases: H4C4, H4/b, H4FB, dJ221C16.9, histone cluster 1, H4d, histone cluster 1 H4 family member d, H4 clustered histone 4, HIST1H4D, H4C5, H4C9, H4C12, H4-16, H4C3, H4C13, H4C11, H4C1, H4C14, H4C15, H4C8, H4C6, H4C2
- External IDs: OMIM: 602823; MGI: 2448441; GeneCards: H4C4
Available structures
PDB	Ortholog search: PDBe RCSB
PDB	List of PDB id codes 4H9O, 3WKJ, 3AYW, 3WA9, 5B0Z, 5AVB, 2CV5, 5AV5, 3AV2, 3WTP, 3AV1, 3AZK, 3X1V, 5AV8, 1F66, 4QUU, 3CFS, 4YYK, 4QUT, 3NQJ, 3A6N, 3W99, 5AVC, 2RS9, 3F9Z, 3QZT, 3QBY, 3W97, 4M38, 4YM6, 3CFV, 4HGA, 1EQZ, 2RJE, 3QZV, 1HQ3, 4H9P, 3AZL, 3AFA, 1TZY, 3UVY, 5CPK, 3JPX, 4U9W, 4N3W, 4YYJ, 4YYD, 4H9N, 4H9R, 3AZI, 4LD9, 3UVX, 3AZH, 5BNX, 4N4F, 1U35, 4YYG, 3O36, 2ARO, 5AV9, 4H9S, 3AZF, 3W98, 4GQB, 4H9Q, 5BNV, 3WAA, 3AZG, 3AZE, 2RNY, 1ZKK, 2QQS, 2LVM, 3X1T, 3AN2, 2KWO, 3QZS, 3F9W, 5FFW, 5CPJ, 3F9X, 3IJ1, 4YM5, 3AZJ, 4YY6, 3AZN, 2IG0, 4YYH, 4YYI, 5CPI, 3W96, 3R45, 2KWN, 3F9Y, 5AV6, 3AZM, 5BO0, 3X1S, 4QYD, 4KGC, 3UVW, 4YYN, 3X1U, 3UW9, 2F8N, 3NQU, 5B0Y, 4YYM, 5C3I, 4Z5T, 5B24, 5FA5, 4Z2M, 5E5A, 5FWE, 5B2I, 5B40, 5B2J, 5JA4, 5AY8, 4ZUX

Gene location (Human)
Chr.	Chromosome 6 (human)
Band	6p22.2	Start	26,188,710 bp
Band	6p22.2	End	26,189,112 bp

Gene location (Mouse)
Chr.	Chromosome 13 (mouse)
Band	13 A3.1|13	Start	21,995,916 bp
Band	13 A3.1|13	End	21,996,317 bp
RNA expression pattern
Bgee	Human / Mouse (ortholog); Top expressed in: epithelium of colon; Achilles tendon; testicle; bone marrow cell; pancreatic ductal cell; corpus callosum; blood; granulocyte; mucosa of transverse colon; tonsil / Top expressed in: spermatid; blastocyst; granulocyte; morula; tail of embryo; embryo; spermatocyte; embryo; yolk sac; thymus; More reference expression data
BioGPS	n/a
Gene ontology
Molecular function	protein domain specific binding; protein binding; protein heterodimerization activity; DNA binding; histone binding; RNA binding
Cellular component	membrane; chromosome; nucleoplasm; extracellular region; nuclear chromosome; nucleosome; extracellular exosome; nucleus; extracellular matrix; protein-containing complex
Biological process	telomere organization; epigenetic maintenance of chromatin in transcription-competent conformation; protein heterotetramerization; negative regulation of megakaryocyte differentiation; CENP-A containing chromatin assembly; DNA replication-dependent chromatin assembly; rDNA heterochromatin assembly; negative regulation of gene expression, epigenetic; DNA-templated transcription, initiation; double-strand break repair via nonhomologous end joining; beta-catenin-TCF complex assembly; telomere capping; nucleosome assembly; regulation of gene silencing by miRNA; regulation of megakaryocyte differentiation; regulation of hematopoietic stem cell differentiation
Sources:Amigo / QuickGO
Orthologs
Databases	NCBI: entry; OMA: entry
Species	Human	Mouse
Entrez	8360	100041230
Ensembl	ENSG00000277157	ENSMUSG00000069306
UniProt	P62805	P62806
RefSeq (mRNA)	NM_003539	NM_001195421
RefSeq (protein)	NP_003537; NP_003486; NP_003535; NP_003539; NP_003531 NP_003536	NP_291074; NP_783587; NP_783588; NP_835499; NP_835500 NP_001182350; NP_835515; NP_783585; NP_783586; NP_835582; NP_835583; NP_783583; NP_694813
Location (UCSC)	Chr 6: 26.19 – 26.19 Mb	Chr 13: 22 – 22 Mb
PubMed search
- Wikidata
View/Edit Human	View/Edit Mouse

Histone H4 is a protein that in humans is encoded by the HIST1H4D gene.

Histones are basic nuclear proteins that are responsible for the nucleosome structure of the chromosomal fiber in eukaryotes. Two molecules of each of the four core histones (H2A, H2B, H3, and H4) form an octamer, around which approximately 146 bp of DNA is wrapped in repeating units, called nucleosomes. The linker histone, H1, interacts with linker DNA between nucleosomes and functions in the compaction of chromatin into higher order structures. This gene is intronless and encodes a member of the histone H4 family. Transcripts from this gene lack polyA tails but instead contain a palindromic termination element. This gene is found in the large histone gene cluster on chromosome 6.
