= 9-cis-epoxycarotenoid dioxygenase =

Class of enzymes

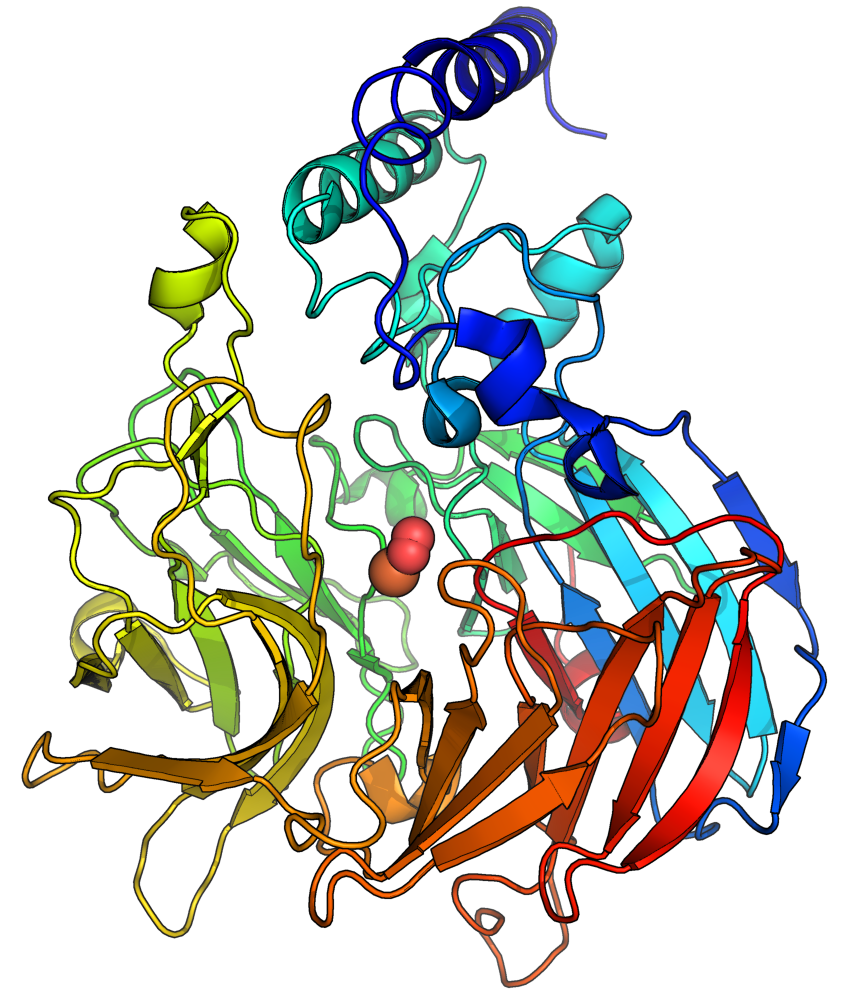
- Corn/maize 9-cis-epoxycarotenoid dioxygenase in complex with iron and molecular oxygen PDB: 3NPE

Identifiers
- EC no.: 1.13.11.51
- CAS no.: 199877-10-6

Databases
- BRENDA: enzyme data
- ExPASy: NiceZyme view
- KEGG: enzyme entry
- MetaCyc: metabolic pathway
- Rhea: reactions
- PDB structures: RCSB PDB PDBe PDBsum
- Gene Ontology: AmiGO / QuickGO
Search
- PMC: articles
- PubMed: articles
- NCBI: proteins

9-cis-epoxycarotenoid dioxygenase (EC 1.13.11.51, nine-cis-epoxycarotenoid dioxygenase, NCED, AtNCED3, PvNCED1, VP14) is an enzyme in the biosynthesis of abscisic acid (ABA), with systematic name 9-cis-epoxycarotenoid 11,12-dioxygenase. This enzyme catalyses the following chemical reaction

(1) a 9-cis-epoxycarotenoid + O_{2} $\rightleftharpoons$ 2-cis,4-trans-xanthoxin + a 12'-apo-carotenal
(2) 9-cis-violaxanthin + O_{2} $\rightleftharpoons$ 2-cis,4-trans-xanthoxin + (3S,5R,6S)-5,6-epoxy-3-hydroxy-5,6-dihydro-12'-apo-beta-caroten-12'-al
(3) 9'-cis-neoxanthin + O_{2} $\rightleftharpoons$ 2-cis,4-trans-xanthoxin + (3S,5R,6R)-5,6-dihydroxy-6,7-didehydro-5,6-dihydro-12'-apo-beta-caroten-12'-al

9-cis-epoxycarotenoid dioxygenase contains iron(II).

== Gene family ==
NCED belongs to a gene family called Carotenoid Cleavage Dioxygenases (CCD), which contains both CCD genes and NCED genes. CCD is available in all plants (including algae), while NCED is currently only observed in land plants. Please note some algae CCD genes have been incorrectly named NCED. There are usually multiple copies of NCED in a species.

== Gene function ==
The enzyme catalyses the rate-limiting step of ABA biosynthesis. Interestingly, though ABA is also produced in algae, NCED is currently only observed in land plants, suggesting ABA is produced in a different pathway in algae compare to land plants.

Though first identified in maize/corn, it is now quite extensively studied in the model plant Arabidopsis thaliana (Arabidopsis). The most studied NCED in Arabidopsis is the AtNCED3. Overexpression of the AtNCED3 gene improves the tolerance of transgenic plants to dehydration stress as well as to salinity stress. Overexpression also leads to the overexpression of other genes induced by drought-stress. Transgenics containing AtNCED3 had greater root biomass, bigger pith size and higher level of photosynthesis. It has been suggested that the AtNCED3 gene promoter contains G-box-like cis-acting elements which are responsible for dehydration-induced expression.

Gene expression differs by plant organ. The gene may have a dual role in roots by either promoting or inhibiting the development of lateral roots. AtNCED3 functions in seeds by regulating the seed establishment and abortion, maturation of the embryo, and seed dormancy. Maternal ABA functions in the early stage of zygote development, while embryonal AtNCED3 expresses later for ABA synthesis in case of dormancy. Expression of the gene mainly happens in the maternal tissues in the basal part of seeds or funiculus.

AtNCED3 gene expression responds to drought-stress. and salt-stress. The signal caused by low moisture in the air is first induced by the stomata of leaves and transferred to other cells and tissues, which upregulate the expression of the AtNCED3 gene and ABA synthesis. Stomata closure limits various processes, including air exchange, water loss and O2 release. The AtNCED3 gene is active and expressed under these circumstances. Accumulation of AtNCED3 mRNA and AtNCED3 protein was first found in the vascular parenchyma cells under drought stress, which suggested that plant drought tolerance relates to the development of plant vascular tissue. Also, overexpression of AtNCED3 gene can improve plant salt tolerance.

Other NCED genes in Arabidopsis are less characterised. However, Tan et al. (2003) observed that other NCED is important in plants and seed development. For example, AtNCED2 and AtNCED9 genes are important in flower development, while AtNCED6 is important in seed dormancy and development. AtNCED5 is found to be important in seed dormancy, and it can interact with AtNCED3 for drought response.
