= Cellular memory modules =

Cellular memory modules are a form of epigenetic inheritance that allow cells to maintain their original identity after a series of cell divisions and developmental processes. Cellular memory modules implement these preserved characteristics into transferred environments through transcriptional memory. Cellular memory modules are primarily found in Drosophila.

== History ==
Cellular memory modules were discovered by François Jacob and Jaques Monod in 1961 at the Pasteur Institute in Paris. The discovery led to Jacob and Monod, along with André Lwoff, receiving The Nobel Prize in Physiology or Medicine in 1965 for their discoveries regarding genetic control of enzyme and virus synthesis. These experimental results mapped the complex processes in which self-regulating processes express or suppress genes. Monod and Jacob proved how genetic information conversion during the construction of proteins was done through a messenger which evinced RNA. Lwoff aided in the experiment that won the Nobel Prize but did not work on the series of experiments that led to the discovery of cellular memory modules, which is why he remains uncredited in its discovery.

== Locations and mechanisms: experiment overviews ==
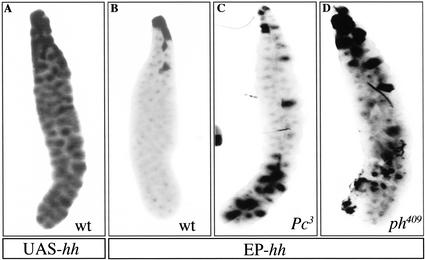
PcG proteins repress transcription in salivary glands. A shows an active transcription. B shows transcription after addition of a promoter. C shows transcription of a mutant protein. D shows transcription become depressed.

Cellular memory modules have the same general process of genes undergoing transcription, these genes being transferred to an unfamiliar environment, and then these genes reverting to their original characteristics preserved through transcriptional memory. Cellular memory modules preserve repressed and active chromatin states in the Polycomb group (PcG) and trithorax group (trxG) proteins by using Polycomb- and trithorax response elements, which are just DNA sequences. Transcription resets and alters epigenetic marks on chromosomal memory elements that are regulated by PcG and trxG proteins. PcG genes maintain silent expression states during the development of Hox genes while trxG proteins maintain Hox gene expression patterns. PcG proteins bind to Polycomb response elements (PREs) to repress the target gene and silence their transcription by excluding transcriptional activators and making the gene unable to undergo RNA synthesis. While the basis of the mechanism among cellular memory modules is the same, what initiates the mechanism and the specific proteins carrying it out differ based on the location of the cellular memory module within the gene. Some of these specific mechanisms and gene locations have been analyzed from experiments and outlined below.

=== Ab-Fab Mechanism ===
This experiment was able to identify a minimal cellular memory module of 219 bp originating from the Drosophila Fab-7 region which regulates the Abdominal-B gene. Recruitment of trxG proteins allows for binding to the DNA binding sites on the Zeste protein, overriding Zeste's need for the Brahma (BRM) protein, and initiating the inheritance of active chromatin. Researchers then took this Zeste protein and mutated its binding sites which increased its role in PcG-dependent silencing. Preserved DNA sequence Ab-Fab recruits BRM and trxG proteins, activating embryogenesis and weakening the bind of PcG to Zeste protein. The effects of Ab-Fab allowed the Zeste protein to return to active chromatin states following its mutation. These response elements were determined to be cellular memory modules as there is DNA overlap and both elements express the memory of both silent and active chromatin by using cell division.

=== H3K27 Mechanism ===
Polycomb repressive complexes (PRC) 1 and 2 are recruited to bind to the H3K27me3 gene, which is found at the beginning of Drosophila embryogenesis. PRC2 then catalyzes the gene's methylation, inducing PCR2 recruitment and compacting the chromatin. The research found that PRC2 recruitment is dependent on the presence of the H2AKub sequence. However, even after mutations in the H3K27 residue, PcGs were able to be recruited and revert to their original phenotypes indicating a transcriptional change in the H3K27 residue.

== Applications ==
=== Synthetic Memory Devices ===
Cellular memory modules are extremely beneficial to synthetic biologists as they are a form of transcriptional memory. Transcription is a well-understood biological process and completes a large amount of the cell's information processing. Due to this, synthetic biologists can develop synthetic memory devices used in experiments that increase our understanding of cellular processes. These devices can record stimulus exposure, maintain gene expression, and identify cell populations that respond to specific events along with tracking their progression throughout the response. This information can carry into disease research because if an event response correlates with future cell behavior, this can give scientists a greater understanding of diseases resulting from cellular inheritance like cancer. Experimenters can use these synthetic memory devices to simulate specific events like exposure to potential disease risk factors to determine their physiological effects early on. This could have life-saving implications as we could receive information we normally only obtain after decades of exposure and disease formation significantly earlier on. This research could guide public health officials and policymakers on recommendations and regulations regarding these risk factors. Additionally, memory modules can accomplish long-term maintenance of their desired protein levels by using their output as regulatory input in order to perform new functions. This allows a memory module to assist in gene therapy, either curing or improving a person's ability to fight disease.

=== Cancer Development ===
Misregulation of PcGs within cellular memory modules often leads to the development of cancerous tumors. PcG's role is to regulate the transcription of developmental genes, which entail processes like cell cycle progression, differentiation, or stem cell plasticity. Due to its imperative role in biological processes, mutations among PcGs initiate tumorigenesis. PcG mutations are more prominent among hormone-dependent cancers where these proteins directly interact with the hormone receptors. It has been discovered that these PcG proteins are able to modulate the tumor microenvironment's metabolism and immune response, impacting the cancer's development. PcGs role in tumorigenesis isn't fully understood although its link to cancer development is widely accepted.
