= HIST1H2AH =

Protein-coding gene in the species Homo sapiens

H2AC12

Identifiers
- Aliases: H2AC12, H2A/S, H2AFALii, H2AH, dJ86C11.1, histone cluster 1, H2ah, histone cluster 1 H2A family member h, HIST1H2AH, H2A clustered histone 12
- External IDs: OMIM: 615013; MGI: 2448295; GeneCards: H2AC12
Available structures
PDB	Ortholog search: PDBe RCSB
PDB	List of PDB id codes 2F8N

Gene location (Human)
Chr.	Chromosome 6 (human)
Band	6p22.1	Start	27,147,106 bp
Band	6p22.1	End	27,147,562 bp

Gene location (Mouse)
Chr.	Chromosome 13 (mouse)
Band	13|13 A3.1	Start	22,219,334 bp
Band	13|13 A3.1	End	22,219,738 bp
RNA expression pattern
Bgee	Human / Mouse (ortholog); Top expressed in: bone marrow cell; Achilles tendon; epithelium of colon; corpus callosum; tonsil; sural nerve; granulocyte; ventricular zone; mucosa of transverse colon; right testis / Top expressed in: uterus; yolk sac; spermatid; embryo; bone marrow; embryo; morula; spermatocyte; thymus; zygote; More reference expression data
BioGPS	n/a
Gene ontology
Molecular function	protein heterodimerization activity; DNA binding; molecular function
Cellular component	nucleosome; extracellular exosome; nucleus; chromosome
Biological process	chromatin organization; biological process
Sources:Amigo / QuickGO
Orthologs
Databases	NCBI: entry; OMA: entry
Species	Human	Mouse
Entrez	85235	319168
Ensembl	ENSG00000274997	ENSMUSG00000069302
UniProt	Q96KK5	Q8CGP6
RefSeq (mRNA)	NM_080596	NM_175659
RefSeq (protein)	NP_542163	NP_783590
Location (UCSC)	Chr 6: 27.15 – 27.15 Mb	Chr 13: 22.22 – 22.22 Mb
PubMed search
- Wikidata
View/Edit Human	View/Edit Mouse

Histone H2A type 1-H is a protein that in humans is encoded by the HIST1H2AH gene.

Histones are basic nuclear proteins that are responsible for the nucleosome structure of the chromosomal fiber in eukaryotes. Two molecules of each of the four core histones (H2A, H2B, H3, and H4) form an octamer, around which approximately 146 bp of DNA is wrapped in repeating units, called nucleosomes. The linker histone, H1, interacts with linker DNA between nucleosomes and functions in the compaction of chromatin into higher order structures. This gene is intronless and encodes a member of the histone H2A family. Transcripts from this gene lack tails but instead contain a palindromic termination element. This gene is found in the histone microcluster on chromosome 6p21.33.
