= Chromosome scaffold =

Proteic structure inside chromosomes

In biology, the chromosome scaffold is the backbone that supports the structure of the chromosomes. It is composed of a group of non-histone proteins that are essential in the structure and maintenance of eukaryotic chromosomes throughout the cell cycle. These scaffold proteins are responsible for the condensation of chromatin during mitosis.

== Origin ==
In the late 1970s, Ulrich K. Laemmli and colleagues discovered a backbone structure in eukaryotic chromosomes after they depleted the histone proteins. This backbone was localized along the chromosome axis, and was termed the 'chromosome scaffold'.

== Proteins of the scaffold ==
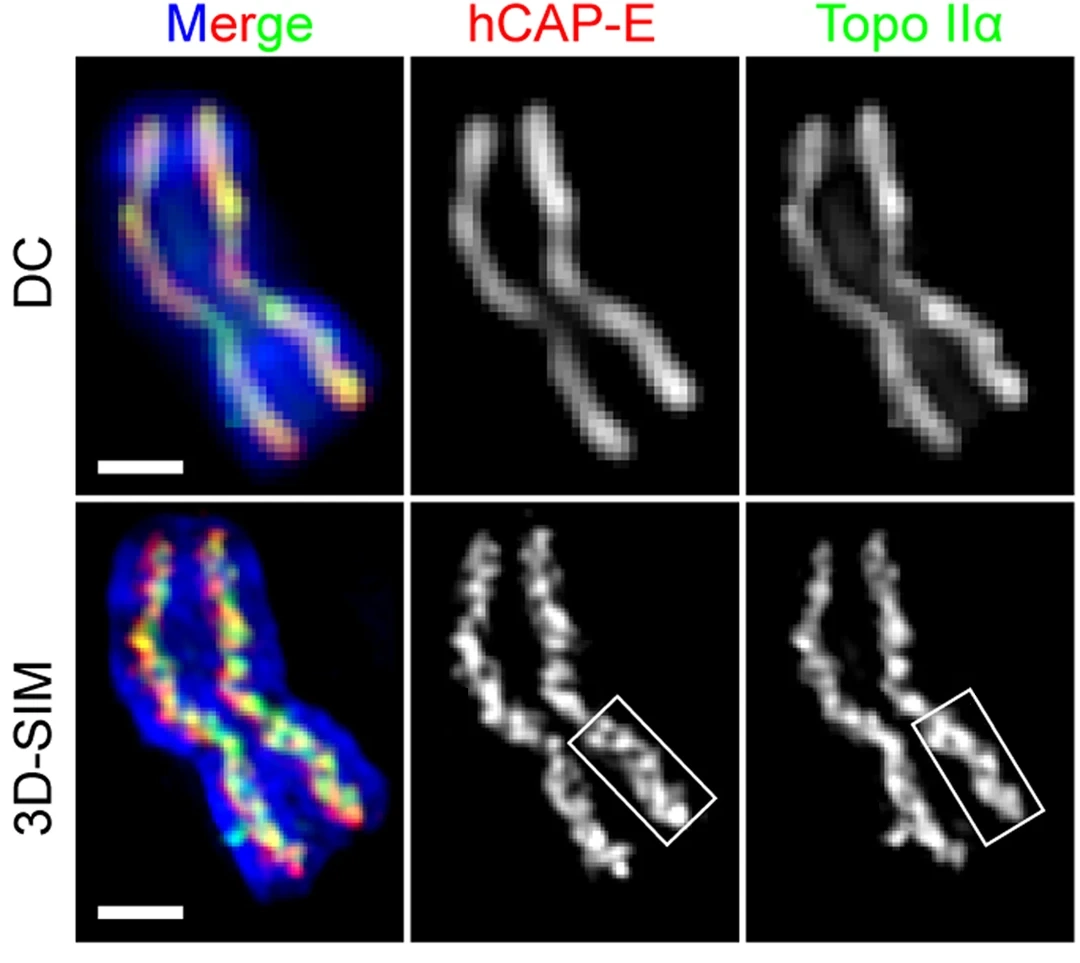
Immunodetection of a chromosome showing DNA (blue) and two scaffold proteins: SMC2 (red) and topoisomerase IIα (green)

In eukaryotic organisms, the DNA of each cell is organized into separated chromosomes, which are composed of chromatin, a mixture of DNA and many different groups of proteins. Among them, the structural proteins (that are not histones) bind the chromatin fiber around themselves forming a long, continuous axis or backbone that gives the chromosomes their shape. For this reason they are known as the 'scaffold' of chromosomes.

Three protein groups have been identified as the main components of the scaffold: DNA topoisomerase IIα, condensins, and the KIF4A kinesin. When these proteins are removed, the chromosome shape does not appear and the chromatin fibers spread out.

=== Topoisomerase IIα ===
The enzyme DNA topoisomerase IIα prominently appears along the chromosome axis as part of the scaffold. In mitosis, it is concentrated at the centromeres and the axis along the chromosome arms. It is thought that the protein has a role in untangling the DNA as the loops become more concentrated along the axis during the condensation of the chromosomes. The removal of this protein causes a dramatic loss of the chromosome structure in mitosis, and the cell cycle comes to a stop.

=== SMC family proteins ===
Condensin complexes, formed from the union of SMC2 and SMC4 (among other proteins), are responsible for the condensation of chromosomes. Condensin I regulates the timing of chromosome condensation and is essential for changing the chromatin organization at the beginning of mitosis, from TADs to an array of loops around the chromosome axis. Condensin II drives the compaction of the chromosome loops along the axis.

In particular, SMC2 (present in condensin I and II) is detected in the interior of the chromosome as part of the scaffold. When SMC2 is inhibited, the structure of the mitotic chromosome suffers grave defects.

=== KIF4 ===
KIF4A, a chromokinesin, is implicated in the shaping of chromosomes during mitosis. It binds to condensin I through the CAP-G subunit. It is known that KIF4A regulates the behavior of condensin I, because in absence of KIF4A the chromosome axis does not become enriched with condensin I.
