= Solenoid (DNA) =

Secondary structure of chromatin

30 nm chromatin fibre in solenoid structure

The solenoid structure of chromatin is a model for the structure of the 30 nm fibre. It is a secondary chromatin structure which helps to package eukaryotic DNA into the nucleus. However, current research casts doubt on its presence in vivo, and tends to show that it is an observational artifact.

== Background ==
Chromatin was first discovered by Walther Flemming by using aniline dyes to stain it. In 1974, it was first proposed by Roger Kornberg that chromatin was based on a repeating unit of a histone octamer and around 200 base pairs of DNA.

The solenoid model was first proposed by John Finch and Aaron Klug in 1976. They used electron microscopy images and X-ray diffraction patterns to determine their model of the structure. This was the first model to be proposed for the structure of the 30 nm fibre.

== Structure ==
DNA in the nucleus is wrapped around nucleosomes, which are histone octamers formed of core histone proteins; two histone H2A-H2B dimers, two histone H3 proteins, and two histone H4 proteins. The primary chromatin structure, the least-packed form, is the 11 nm, or “beads on a string” form, where DNA is wrapped around nucleosomes at relatively regular intervals, as Roger Kornberg proposed.

Histone H1 protein binds to the site where DNA enters and exits the nucleosome, wrapping 147 base pairs around the histone core and stabilising the nucleosome, this structure is a chromatosome. In the solenoid structure, the nucleosomes fold up and are stacked, forming a helix. They are connected by bent linker DNA which positions sequential nucleosomes adjacent to one another in the helix. The nucleosomes are positioned with the histone H1 proteins facing toward the centre where they form a polymer. Finch and Klug determined that the helical structure had only one-start point because they mostly observed small pitch angles of 11 nm, which is about the same diameter as a nucleosome. There are approximately 6 nucleosomes in each turn of the helix. Finch and Klug actually observed a wide range of nucleosomes per turn but they put this down to flattening.

Finch and Klug's electron microscopy images had a lack of visible detail so they were unable to determine helical parameters other than the pitch. More recent electron microscopy images have been able to define the dimensions of solenoid structures and identified it as a left-handed helix. The structure of solenoids are insensitive to changes in the length of the linker DNA.

== Function ==
The solenoid structure's most obvious function is to help package the DNA so that it is small enough to fit into the nucleus. This is a big task as the nucleus of a mammalian cell has a diameter of approximately 6 μm, whilst the DNA in one human cell would stretch to just over 2 metres long if it were unwound. The "beads on a string" structure can compact DNA to 7 times smaller. The solenoid structure can increase this to be 40 times smaller.

When DNA is compacted into the solenoid structure can still be transcriptionally active in certain areas. It is the secondary chromatin structure that is important for this transcriptional repression as in vivo active genes are assembled in large tertiary chromatin structures.

== Formation ==
There are many factors that affect whether the solenoid structure will form or not. Some factors alter the structure of the 30 nm fibre, and some prevent it from forming in that region altogether.

The concentration of ions, particularly divalent cations affects the structure of the 30 nm fibre, which is why Finch and Klug were not able to form solenoid structures in the presence of chelating agents.

There is an acidic patch on the surface of histone H2A and histone H2B proteins which interacts with the tails of histone H4 proteins in adjacent nucleosomes. These interactions are important for solenoid formation. Histone variants can affect solenoid formation, for example H2A.Z is a histone variant of H2A, and it has a more acidic patch than the one on H2A, so H2A.Z would have a stronger interaction with histone H4 tails and probably contribute to solenoid formation.

The histone H4 tail is essential for formation of 30 nm fibres. However, acetylation of core histone tails affects the folding of chromatin by destabilising interactions between the DNA and the nucleosomes, making histone modulation a key factor in solenoid structure. Acetylation of H4K16 (the lysine which is the 16th amino acid from the N-terminal of histone H4) inhibits 30 nm fibre formation.

To decompact the 30 nm fibre, for instance to transcriptionally activate it, both H4K16 acetylation and removal of the histone H1 proteins are required.

== Further packaging ==
Chromatin can form a tertiary chromatin structure and be compacted even further than the solenoid structure by forming supercoils which have a diameter of around 700 nm. This supercoil is formed by regions of DNA called scaffold/matrix attachment regions (SMARs) attaching to a central scaffolding matrix in the nucleus creating loops of solenoid chromatin between 4.5 and 112 kilobase pairs long. The central scaffolding matrix itself forms a spiral shape for an additional layer of compaction.

== Alternative models ==
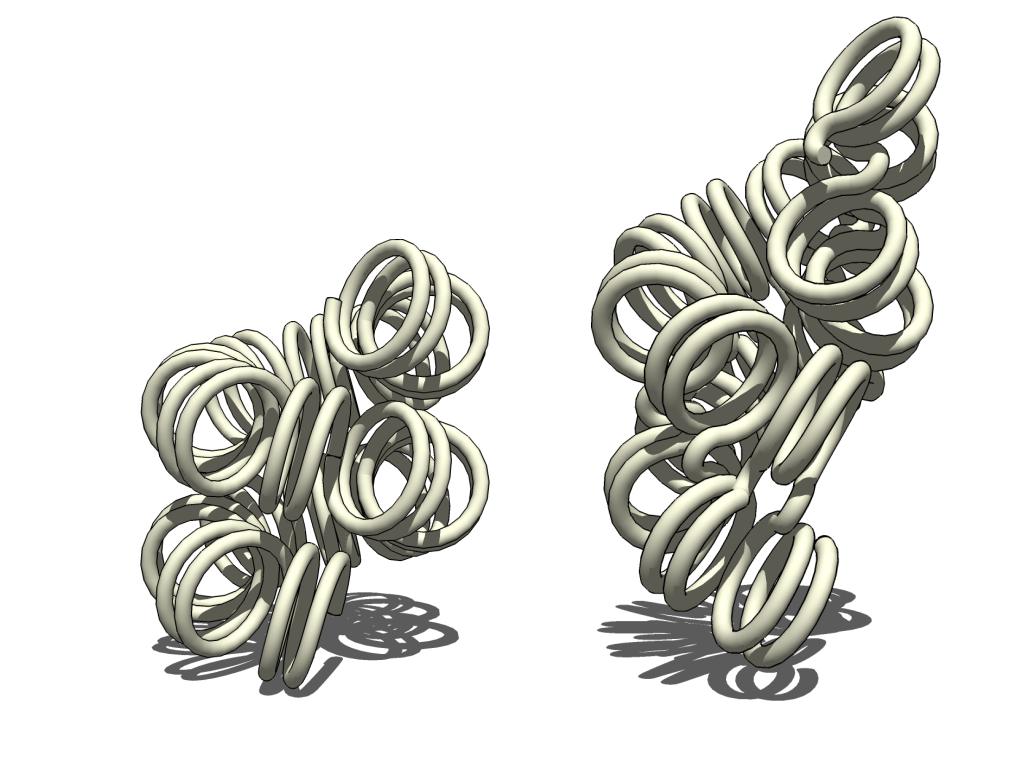
Solenoid model (left) and two-start twisted- ribbon model (right) of 30 nm fibre, showing DNA only.

Several other models have been proposed and there is still a lot of uncertainty about the structure of the 30 nm fibre.

Even the more recent research produces conflicting information. There is data from electron microscopy measurements of the 30 nm fibre dimensions that has physical constraints which mean it can only be modelled with a one-start helical structure like the solenoid structure. It also shows there is no linear relationship between the length of the linker DNA and the dimensions (instead there are two distinct classes). There is also data from experiments which cross-linked nucleosomes that shows a two-start structure. There is evidence that suggests both the solenoid and zig-zag (two-start) structures are present in 30 nm fibres. It is possible that chromatin structure may not be as ordered as previously thought, or that the 30 nm fibre may not even be present in situ.

=== Two-start twisted-ribbon model ===
The two-start twisted-ribbon model was proposed in 1981 by Worcel, Strogatz and Riley. This structure involves alternating nucleosomes stacking to form two parallel helices, with the linker DNA zig-zagging up and down the helical axis.

=== Two-start cross-linker model ===
The two-start cross-linker model was proposed in 1986 by Williams et al. This structure, like the two-start twisted-ribbon model, involves alternating nucleosomes stacking to form two parallel helices, but the nucleosomes are on opposite sides of the helices with the linker DNA crossing across the centre of the helical axis.

=== Superbead model ===
The superbead model was proposed by Renz in 1977. This structure is not helical like the other models, it instead consists of discrete globular structures along the chromatin which vary in size.

== Some alternative forms of DNA packaging ==
The chromatin in mammalian sperm is the most condensed form of eukaryotic DNA, it is packaged by protamines rather than nucleosomes, whilst prokaryotes package their DNA through supercoiling.
