= Histone-modifying enzymes =

Type of enzymes

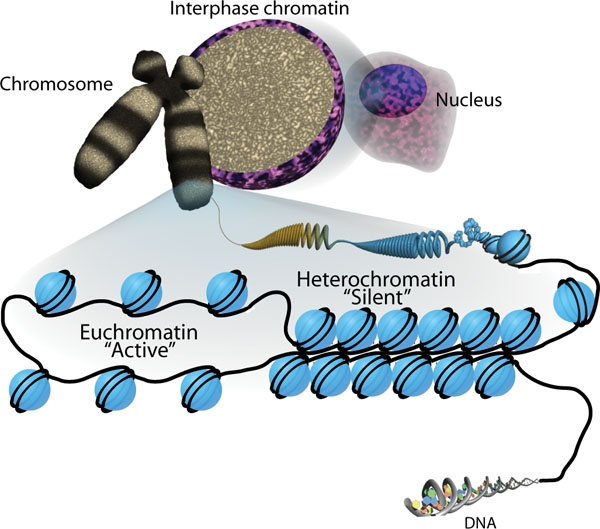
DNA is wrapped around histones to form nucleosomes. Nucleosomes are shown as "beads on a string" with the distinction between euchromatin and heterochromatin.

The basic units of chromatin structure.

Histone-modifying enzymes are enzymes involved in the modification of histone substrates after protein translation and affect cellular processes including gene expression. To safely store the eukaryotic genome, DNA is wrapped around four core histone proteins (H3, H4, H2A, H2B), which then join to form nucleosomes. These nucleosomes further fold together into highly condensed chromatin, which renders the organism's genetic material far less accessible to the factors required for gene transcription, DNA replication, recombination and repair. Subsequently, eukaryotic organisms have developed intricate mechanisms to overcome this repressive barrier imposed by the chromatin through histone modification, a type of post-translational modification which typically involves covalently attaching certain groups to histone residues. Once added to the histone, these groups (directly or indirectly) elicit either a loose and open histone conformation, euchromatin, or a tight and closed histone conformation, heterochromatin. Euchromatin marks active transcription and gene expression, as the light packing of histones in this way allows entry for proteins involved in the transcription process. As such, the tightly packed heterochromatin marks the absence of current gene expression.

While there exist several distinct post-translational modifications for histones, the four most common histone modifications include acetylation, methylation, phosphorylation and ubiquitination. Histone-modifying enzymes that induce a modification (e.g., add a functional group) are dubbed writers, while enzymes that revert modifications are dubbed erasers. Furthermore, there are many uncommon histone modifications including O-GlcNAcylation, sumoylation, ADP-ribosylation, citrullination and proline isomerization. For a detailed example of histone modifications in transcription regulation see RNA polymerase control by chromatin structure and table "Examples of histone modifications in transcriptional regulation".

== Common histone modifications ==
The four common histone modifications and their respective writer and eraser enzymes are shown in the table below.

Modification	Writer(s)	Eraser(s)	Effect on DNA
Acetylation	Histone acetyltransferases (HATs)	Histone deacetylases (HDACs)	Increases gene transcription
Methylation	Histone methyltransferases (HMTs)	Histone demethylases (KDMs)	Increases or decreases gene transcription
Phosphorylation	Protein kinases (PTKs)	Protein phosphatases (PPs)	Increases gene transcription & plays role in DNA repair and cell division
Ubiquitination	Ubiquitin ligases	Deubiquitinating enzymes (DUBs)	Increases or decreases gene transcription & plays role in DNA repair

=== Acetylation ===
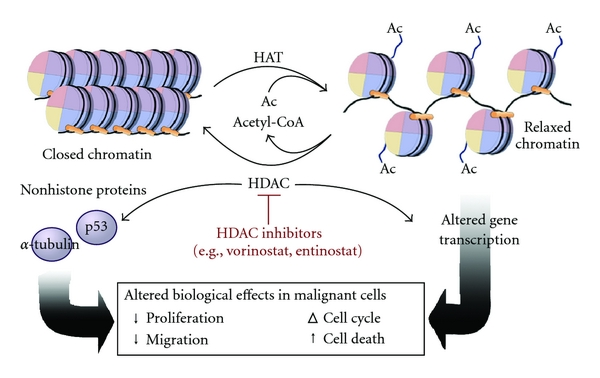
The dynamic state of histone acetylation/deacetylation regulated by HAT and HDAC enzymes; acetylation of histones alters accessibility of chromatin.

Histone acetylation, or the addition of an acetyl group to histones, is facilitated by histone acetyltransferases (HATs) which target lysine (K) residues on the N-terminal histone tail. Histone deacetylases (HDACs) facilitate the removal of such groups. The positive charge on a histone is always neutralized upon acetylation, creating euchromatin which increases transcription and expression of the target gene. Lysine residues 9, 14, 18, and 23 of core histone H3 and residues 5, 8, 12, and 16 of H4 are all targeted for acetylation.

=== Methylation ===
Histone methylation involves adding methyl groups to histones, primarily on lysine (K) or arginine (R) residues. The addition and removal of methyl groups is carried out by histone methyltransferases (HMTs) and histone demethylases (KDMs) respectively. Histone methylation is responsible for either activation or repression of genes, depending on the target site, and plays an important role in development and learning.

=== Phosphorylation ===
A phosphoryl group is shown in blue.

Histone phosphorylation occurs when a phosphoryl group is added to a histone. Protein kinases (PTKs) catalyze the phosphorylation of histones and protein phosphatases (PPs) catalyze the dephosphorylation of histones. Much like histone acetylation, histone phosphorylation neutralizes the positive charge on histones which induces euchromatin and increases gene expression. Histone phosphorylation occurs on serine (S), threonine (T) and tyrosine (Y) amino-acid residues mainly in the N-terminal histone tails.

Additionally, the phosphorylation of histones has been found to play a role in DNA repair and chromatin condensation during cell division. One such example is the phosphorylation of S139 on H2AX histones, which is needed to repair double-stranded breaks in the DNA.

=== Ubiquitination ===
Ubiquitination is a post-translational modification involving the addition of ubiquitin proteins onto target proteins. Histones are often ubiquitinated with one ubiquitin molecule (monoubiquitination), but can also be modified with ubiquitin chains (polyubiquitination), both of which can have variable effects on gene transcription. Ubiquitin ligases add these ubiquitin proteins while deubiquitinating enzymes (DUBs) remove these groups. Ubiquitination of the H2A core histone typically represses gene expression as it prevents methylation at H3K4, while H2B ubiquitination is necessary for H3K4 methylation and can lead to both gene activation or repression. Additionally, histone ubiquitination is related to genomic maintenance, as ubiquitination of histone H2AX is involved in DNA damage recognition of DNA double-strand breaks.

== Uncommon histone modifications ==
Additional infrequent histone modifications and their effects are listed in the table below.

Modification	Writer(s)	Eraser(s)	Effect on DNA
O-GlcNAcylation	O-GlcNAc transferase (OGT)	O-GlcNAcase (OGA)	Increases or decreases transcription via mediation of additional histone modifications
Sumoylation	E3 SUMO ligases	SUMO-specific proteases	Increases or decreases transcription & plays role in DNA repair
ADP-ribosylation	Poly-ADP ribose polymerase 1 (PARP-1)	(Adp-ribosyl)hydrolases ARH1 & ARH3	Decreases transcription when marking specific DNA sites for repair
Citrullination	Protein arginine deiminase 4 (PAD4)	No known eraser	Decreases transcription via removing methylation sites
Proline isomerization	Fpr4	Fpr4	Increases or decreases transcription via switching between H3P38 isomers (trans and cis respectively)

=== O-GlcNAcylation ===
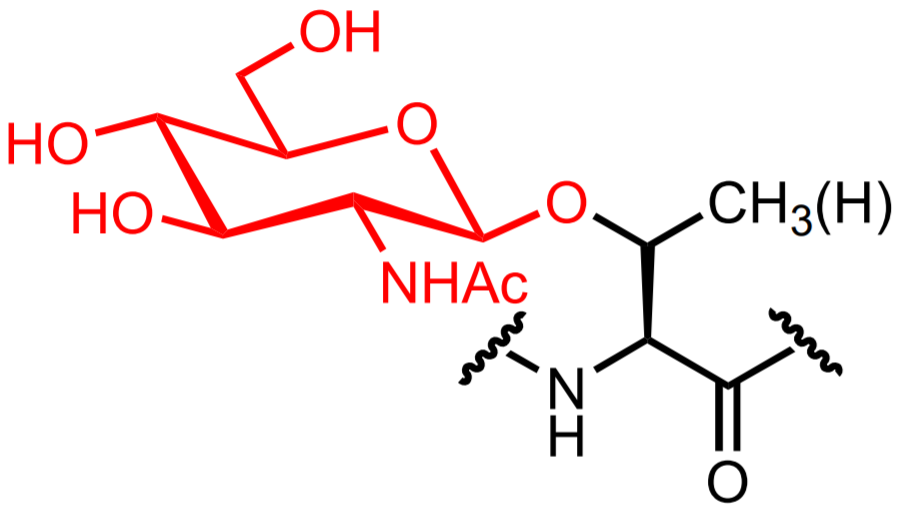
An O-GlcNAcylated threonine residue. The GlcNAc moiety is shown in red while the modified threonine is shown in black.

The presence of O-GlcNAcylation (O-GlcNAc) on serine (S) and threonine (T) histone residues is known to mediate other post-transcriptional histone modifications. The addition and removal of GlcNAc groups are performed by O-GlcNAc transferase (OGT) and O-GlcNAcase (OGA) respectively. While our understanding of these processes is limited, GlcNAcylation of S112 on core histone H2B has been found to promote monoubiquitination of K120. Similarly, OGT associates with the HCF1 complex which interacts with BAP1 to mediate deubiquitination of H2A. OGT is also involved in the trimethylation of H3K27 and creates a co-repressor complex to promote histone deacetylation upon binding to SIN3A.

=== Sumoylation ===
SUMOylation refers to the addition of Small Ubiquitin-like Modifier (SUMO) proteins onto histones. SUMOylation involves covalent attachments between SUMO proteins and lysine (K) residues on histones and is carried out in three main steps by three respective enzymes: activation via SUMO E1, conjugation via SUMO E2, and ligation via SUMO E3. In humans, SUMO E1 has been identified as the heterodimer SAE1/SAE2, SUMO E2 is known as UBE2I, and the SUMO E3 role may be a multi-protein complex played by a handful of different enzymes.

SUMOylation affects the chromatin status (looseness) of the histone and influences the assembly of transcription factors on genetic promoters, leading to either transcriptional repression or activation depending on the substrate. SUMOylation also plays a role in the major DNA repair pathways of base excision repair, nucleotide excision repair, non-homologous end joining and homologous recombination repair. Additionally, SUMOylation facilitates error prone translesion synthesis.

=== ADP-ribosylation ===
An adenosine diphosphate ribose group.

ADP-ribosylation (ADPr) defines the addition of one or more adenosine diphosphate ribose (ADP-ribose) groups to a protein. ADPr is an important mechanism in gene regulation that affects chromatin organization, the binding of transcription factors, and mRNA processing through poly-ADP ribose polymerase (PARP) enzymes. There are multiple types of PARP proteins, but the subclass of DNA-dependent PARP proteins including PARP-1, PARP-2, and PARP-3 interact with the histone. The PARP-1 enzyme is the most prominent of these three proteins in the context of gene regulation and interacts with all five histone proteins.

Like PARPs 2 and 3, the catalytic activity of PARP-1 is activated by discontinuous DNA fragments, DNA fragments with single-stranded breaks. PARP-1 binds histones near the axis where DNA enters and exits the nucleosome and additionally interacts with numerous chromatin-associated proteins which allow for indirect association with chromatin. Upon binding to chromatin, PARP-1 produces repressive histone marks that can alter the conformational state of histones and inhibit gene expression so that DNA repair can take place. Other avenues of transcription regulation by PARP-1 include acting as a transcription coregulator, regulation of RNA and modulation of DNA methylation via inhibiting the DNA methyltransferase Dnmt1.

=== Citrullination ===
The amino acid arginine (left) is converted to citrulline (right) via the process of citrullination.

Citrullination, or deimination, is the process by which the amino acid arginine (R) is converted into citrulline. Protein arginine deiminases (PADs) replace the ketimine group of arginine with a ketone group to form the citrulline. PAD4 is the deaminase involved in histone modification and converts arginine to citrulline on histones H3 and H4; because arginine methylation on these histones is important for transcriptional activation, citrullination of certain residues can cause the eventual loss of methylation, leading to decreased gene transcription; specific citrullination of H3R2, H3R8, H3R17, and H3R26 residues have been identified in breast cancer cells. As of research conducted in 2019, this process is thought to be irreversible.

=== Proline Isomerization ===
Proline trans-cis isomerization by a PPIase enzyme.

Isomerization involves transforming a molecule so that it adopts a different structural conformation; proline isomerization plays an integral role in the modification of histone tails. Fpr4 is the prolyl isomerase enzyme (PPIase) which converts the amino acid proline (P) on histones between the cis and trans conformations. While Fpr4 has catalytic activity on a number of prolines on the N-terminal region of core histone H3 (P16, P30 and P38), it most readily binds to P38.

H3P38 lies near the lysine (K) residue H3K36, and changes in P38 can affect the methylation status of K36. The two possible P38 isomers available, cis and trans, cause differential effects that are opposite of each other. The cis position induces compact histones and decreases the ability of proteins to bind to the DNA, thus preventing methylation of K36 and decreasing gene transcription. Conversely, the trans position of P38 promotes a more open histone conformation, allowing for K36 methylation and leading to an increase gene transcription.

== Role in research ==
=== Cancer ===
Alterations in the functions of histone-modifying enzymes deregulate the control of chromatin-based processes, ultimately leading to oncogenic transformation and cancer. Both DNA methylation and histone modifications show patterns of distribution in cancer cells. These epigenetic alterations may occur at different stages of tumourigenesis and thus contribute to both the development and/or progression of cancer.

=== Other Research ===
Vitamin B12 deficiency in mice has been shown to alter expression of histone modifying enzymes in the brain, leading to behavioral changes and epigenetic reprogramming. Evidences also show the importance of HDACs in regulation of lipid metabolism and other metabolic pathways playing a role in the pathophysiology of metabolic disorders.

== See also ==
- DNA
- Histone
- Nucleosome
- Chromatin
- Euchromatin
- Heterochromatin
- Histone acetylation and deacetylation
- Histone methylation
- Protein phosphorylation
- Ubiquitin
- O-GlcNAc
- Sumoylation
- ADP-ribosylation
- Citrullination
- Proline isomerization in epigenetics
