= Chromatin variant =

A chromatin variant (also known as an epigenetic lesion, epimutation or epigenetic alteration) corresponds to a section of the genome that differs in chromatin states across cell types/states within an individual (intra-individual) or between individuals for a given cell type/state (inter-individual). Chromatin variants distinguish DNA sequences that differ in their function in one cell type/state versus another. Chromatin variants are found across the genome, inclusive of repetitive and non-repetitive DNA sequences. Chromatin variants range in sizes. The smallest chromatin variants cover a few hundred DNA base pairs, such as seen at promoters, enhancers or insulators. The largest chromatin variants capture a few thousand DNA base pairs, such as seen at Large Organized Chromatin Lysine domains (LOCKs) and Clusters Of Cis-Regulatory Elements (COREs), such as super-enhancer.
