= Bookmarking =

Mechanism of transmission of gene expression programs through cell division

Bookmarking (also "gene bookmarking" or "mitotic bookmarking") refers to a potential mechanism of transmission of gene expression programs through cell division.

During mitosis, gene transcription is silenced and most transcription factors are removed from chromatin. The term bookmarking compares transcription to reading from a book. The pause in transcription during mitosis is like closing the book. "Molecular bookmarks" are the factors that allow transcription to resume in an orderly fashion in newborn cells following mitosis (when the book is re-opened).

Bookmarks fulfill the following criteria:

- at some point prior to the onset of mitosis, the promoters of genes that exist in a transcription-competent state become "marked" in some way,
- this "mark" persists both during and after mitosis, and
- the marking transmits gene expression memory by preventing the mitotic compaction of DNA at this locus, or by facilitating reassembly of transcription complexes on the promoter, or both.

== Bookmarking as selective maintenance of an open chromatin state ==
The term bookmarking was originally coined to describe the non-compaction of some gene promoters during mitosis. More recently genome accessibility during interphase and mitosis has been directly compared on a genome-wide scale. While gene promoters tend to be better preserved than distal regulatory elements, substantial variation exists at individual sites.

== Bookmarking by DNA methylation, histone post-translation modification, and histone variants ==
Some patterns of histone modification and the presence of some histone variants on DNA remain unchanged during mitosis and have the potential to act as bookmarks. Patterns of DNA methylation are generally unchanged and also have the potential to function as bookmarks.

== Bookmarking by transcription factors ==
Notable transcription factors implicated in mitotic bookmarking include:

- BRD4
- GATA1
- HSP70
- TFIID
- ESRRB
