= Transcriptional memory =

Biological phenomenon

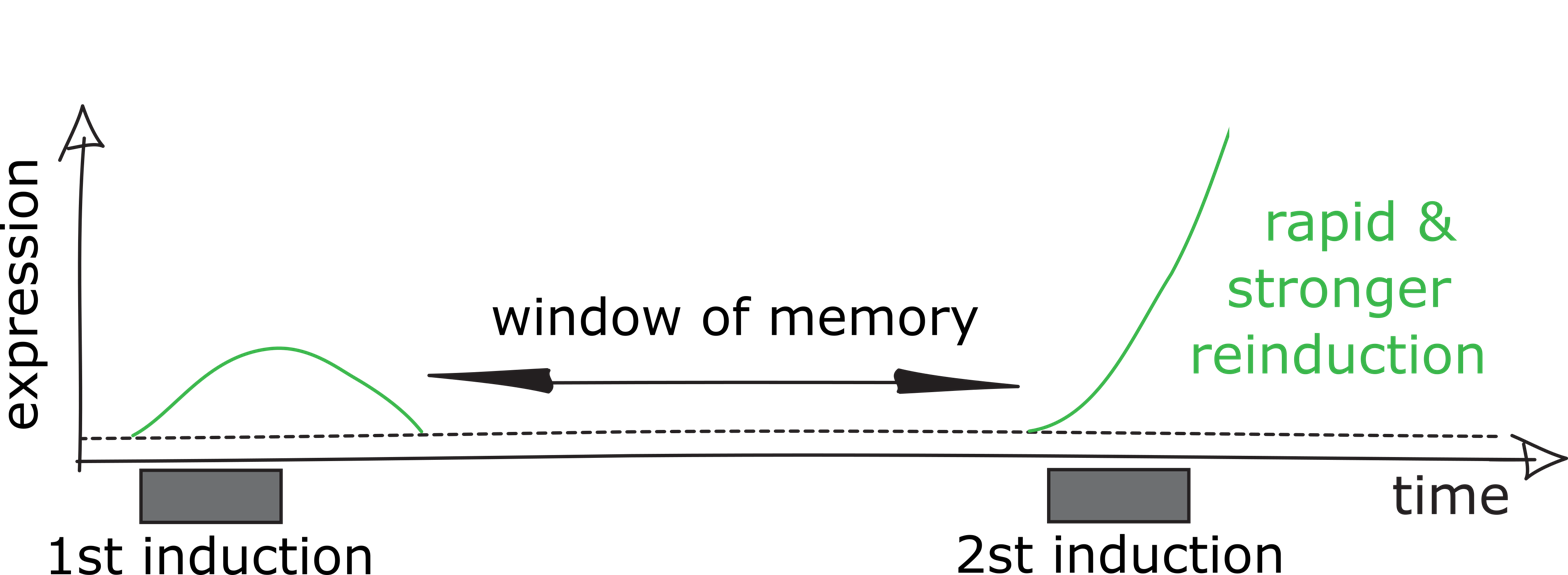
Principle of transcriptional memory. A pulse of an inducer (priming) results in expression of target genes, which subsides upon withdrawal. During a window of no induction (window of memory), some genes maintain a poised but transcriptionally silent state that results in a stronger gene activation upon a second challenge.

Transcriptional memory is a biological phenomenon, initially discovered in yeast, during which cells primed with a particular cue show increased rates of gene expression after re-stimulation at a later time. This event was shown to take place: in yeast during growth in galactose and inositol starvation; plants during environmental stress; in mammalian cells during LPS and interferon induction. Prior work has shown that certain characteristics of chromatin may contribute to the poised transcriptional state allowing faster re-induction. These include: activity of specific transcription factors, retention of RNA polymerase II at the promoters of poised genes, activity of chromatin remodeling complexes, propagation of H3K4me2 and H3K36me3 histone modifications, occupancy of the H3.3 histone variant, as well as binding of nuclear pore components. Moreover, locally bound cohesin was shown to inhibit establishment of transcriptional memory in human cells during interferon gamma stimulation.
