= Chromatosome =

Nucleosome bound with histone H1

Basic units of chromatin structure

In molecular biology, a chromatosome is a result of histone H1 binding to a nucleosome, which contains a histone octamer and DNA. The chromatosome contains 166 base pairs of DNA. 146 base pairs are from the DNA wrapped around the histone core of the nucleosome. The remaining 20 base pairs are from the DNA of histone H1 binding to the nucleosome. Histone H1, and its other variants, are referred to as linker histones. Protruding from the linker histone are linker DNA. Chromatosomes are connected to each other when the linker DNA of one chromatosome binds to the linker histone of another chromatosome.

== Picture ==
https://www.rcsb.org/pdb/explore.do?structureId=4QLC
