= Active chromatin sequence =

Region of DNA in a eukaryotic chromosome

Heterochromatin vs. euchromatin

An active chromatin sequence (ACS) is a region of DNA in a eukaryotic chromosome in which histone modifications such as acetylation lead to exposure of the DNA sequence thus allowing binding of transcription factors and transcription to take place. Active chromatin may also be called euchromatin. ACSs may occur in non-expressed gene regions which are assumed to be "poised" for transcription. The sequence once exposed often contains a promoter to begin transcription. At this site acetylation or methylation can take place causing a conformational change to the chromatin. At the active chromatin sequence site deacetylation can cause the gene to be repressed if not being expressed.

The molecular basis for the accessibility of active chromatin sequences lies in the post-translational modification of histone tails, particularly on histones H3 and H4. Histone H3 lysine 27 acetylation (H3K27ac) is frequently used as a marker of active cis-regulatory elements, while H3K4me1 and H3K4me3 distinguish enhancers from promoters, respectively. Acetylation is catalyzed by histone acetyltransferases (HATs) such as the SAGA and ATAC complexes, which neutralize the positive charge of lysine residues on histone tails and thereby weaken histone–DNA contacts.

Active chromatin sequences are operationally detectable by their hypersensitivity to nuclease digestion, a property that has been exploited for decades to map regulatory DNA on a genome-wide scale. Hypersensitive sites correspond to sites without nucleosomes, in which the DNA is associated with non-histone proteins rather than being naked, and these sites coincide with regulatory rather than coding regions in areas of active transcription. Methods such as DNase-seq, FAIRE-seq, and ATAC-seq exploit this accessibility to identify active chromatin sequences across the genome. Even within large repressive heterochromatin domains, small euchromatin islands can be identified that are markedly enriched for DNase I hypersensitive sites and for the binding of CTCF, the major organizer of higher-order chromatin. This observation indicates that active chromatin sequences are not uniformly distributed but instead form discrete accessible windows embedded within otherwise silenced genomic territory.

== See also ==
- Chromatin
- Epigenetics
- Histone modification
- Euchromatin
- Heterochromatin
