= SMC2 =

Protein-coding gene in humans

Identifiers
- Aliases: SMC2, CAP-E, CAPE, SMC-2, SMC2L1, structural maintenance of chromosomes 2
- External IDs: OMIM: 605576; MGI: 106067; GeneCards: SMC2
Available structures
PDB	Ortholog search: PDBe RCSB
PDB	List of PDB id codes 4U4P

Gene location (Human)
Chr.	Chromosome 9 (human)
Band	9q31.1	Start	104,094,260 bp
Band	9q31.1	End	104,141,419 bp

Gene location (Mouse)
Chr.	Chromosome 4 (mouse)
Band	4 B2|4 28.31 cM	Start	52,439,243 bp
Band	4 B2|4 28.31 cM	End	52,488,260 bp
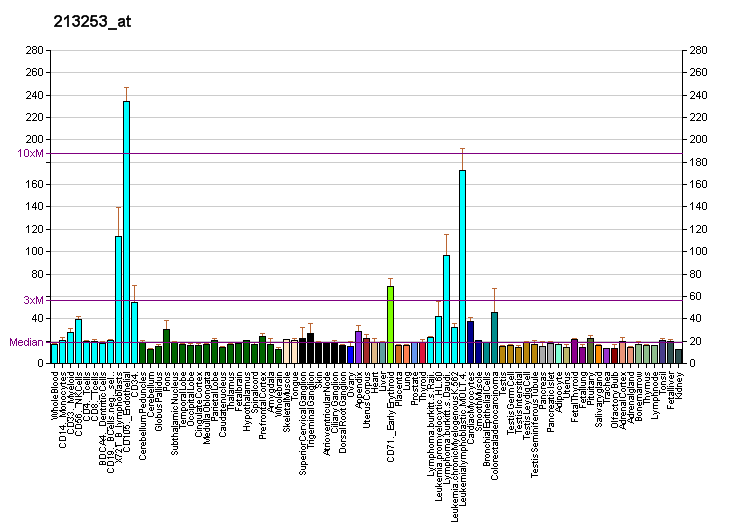

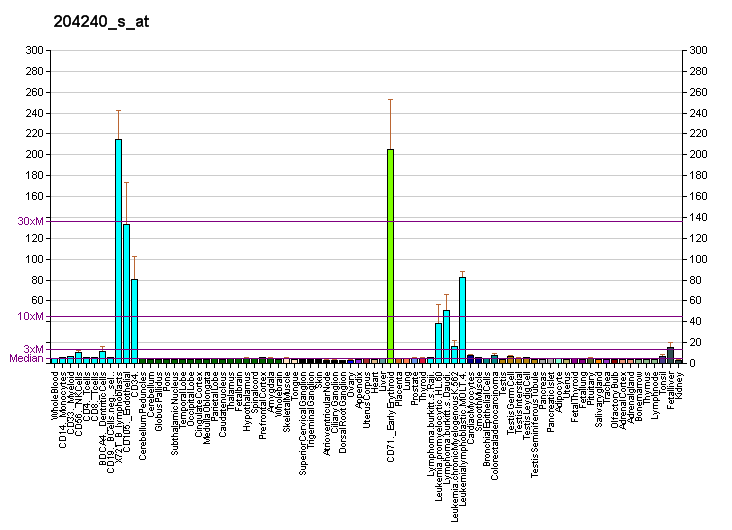
RNA expression pattern
Bgee	Human / Mouse (ortholog); Top expressed in: ventricular zone; testicle; ganglionic eminence; gonad; Achilles tendon; secondary oocyte; sperm; trabecular bone; bone marrow; bone marrow cell / Top expressed in: tail of embryo; genital tubercle; primitive streak; abdominal wall; maxillary prominence; fetal liver hematopoietic progenitor cell; mandibular prominence; vas deferens; dermis; migratory enteric neural crest cell; More reference expression data
BioGPS	More reference expression data
Gene ontology
Molecular function	nucleotide binding; protein binding; protein heterodimerization activity; ATP binding; single-stranded DNA binding
Cellular component	cytoplasm; cytosol; chromosome; nucleoplasm; condensin complex; nuclear chromosome; nucleolus; extracellular exosome; condensed chromosome; nucleus
Biological process	kinetochore organization; meiotic chromosome condensation; chromosome organization; meiotic chromosome segregation; cell division; chromosome condensation; cell cycle; mitotic chromosome condensation
Sources:Amigo / QuickGO
Orthologs
Databases	NCBI: entry; OMA: entry
Species	Human	Mouse
Entrez	10592	14211
Ensembl	ENSG00000136824	ENSMUSG00000028312
UniProt	O95347; Q05D74	Q8CG48
RefSeq (mRNA)	NM_001042550; NM_001042551; NM_001265602; NM_006444	NM_001301412; NM_008017
RefSeq (protein)	NP_001036015; NP_001036016; NP_001252531; NP_006435; NP_006435.2	NP_001288341; NP_032043
Location (UCSC)	Chr 9: 104.09 – 104.14 Mb	Chr 4: 52.44 – 52.49 Mb
PubMed search
- Wikidata
View/Edit Human	View/Edit Mouse

Structural maintenance of chromosomes protein 2 (SMC-2), also known as chromosome-associated protein E (CAP-E), is a protein that in humans is encoded by the SMC2 gene. SMC2 is part of the SMC protein family and is a core subunit of condensin I and II, large protein complexes involved in chromosome condensation, overall organization. Several studies have demonstrated the necessity of SMC2 for cell division and proliferation.

== Structure ==
As one of the 6 Eukaryotic SMC proteins, SMC2 forms a heterodimer with SMC4 via their hinge domains. The heterodimer formed functions as a flexible and dynamic holocomplex core, which complexes with variant other non-SMC regulatory proteins to form condensin. In condensin I, SMC2 complexes with CAP-H, CAP-D2, and CAP-G. In condensin II, SMC2 complexes with CAP-H2, CAP-D3, and CAP-G2. Subunits CAP-H and CAP-H2 are categorized as kleisin proteins, similar to Scc1 which is found in cohesin, while CAP-D2, CAP-G, CAP-D3, and CAP-G2 contain structural HEAT repeats.

Structure of a condensin protein holocomplex, displaying the SMC-2/SMC-4 heterodimer, and additional subunits. Kleisin is also depicted (blue).

== Function ==
SMC2 works in the condensin complex as transcriptional regulation by compacting replicated DNA prior to mitotic division via supercoiling of the DNA. SMC2 also functions in resolving sister chromatids prior to anaphase.

== Interactions ==
SMC2 has been shown to interact with DNMT3B.

== Clinical significance ==
=== Cornelia de Lange Syndrome ===
Mutations in the SMC2 gene have been associated with a variety of human diseases, including Cornelia de Lange syndrome (CdLS), which is characterized by developmental abnormalities, cognitive impairment, and a range of physical abnormalities. A study showed a deletion of a portion of the long arm of chromosome 9 (9q31.1-q32) causes symptoms similar to those found in patients with CdLS. This deletion overlaps the gene encoding SMC2. Many mutations in a variety of different genes have been linked to CdLS, however around 30% of cases have not been linked to one of the known genes. More research is being done to discover other causes for this syndrome.

=== Cancer ===
Other studies have suggested that alterations in SMC2 protein expression may be involved in the development and progression of cancer. Overexpression of SMC2 has been found to lead to tumorigenesis and malignancy. Now, some research studies are exploring inhibition of SMC2 as a potential therapeutic target for the treatment of cancer as the inhibition of SMC2 expression or activity can lead to the induction of cell death in cancer cells.
