= Euchromatin =

Lightly packed form of chromatin that is enriched in genes

Distinction between euchromatin and heterochromatin

Euchromatin (also called "open chromatin") is a lightly packed form of chromatin (DNA, RNA, and protein) that is enriched in genes, and is often (but not always) under active transcription. Euchromatin stands in contrast to heterochromatin, which is tightly packed and less accessible for transcription. 92% of the human genome is euchromatic.

In eukaryotes, euchromatin comprises the most active portion of the genome within the cell nucleus. In prokaryotes, euchromatin is the only form of chromatin present; this indicates that the heterochromatin structure evolved later along with the nucleus, possibly as a mechanism to handle increasing genome size.

== Structure ==
Euchromatin is composed of repeating subunits known as nucleosomes, reminiscent of an unfolded set of beads on a string, that are approximately 11 nm in diameter. At the core of these nucleosomes are a set of four histone protein pairs: H3, H4, H2A, and H2B. Each core histone protein possesses a 'tail' structure, which can vary in several ways; it is thought that these variations act as "master control switches" through different methylation and acetylation states, which determine the overall arrangement of the chromatin. Approximately 147 base pairs of DNA are wound around the histone octamers, or a little less than 2 turns of the helix. Nucleosomes along the strand are linked together via the histone, H1, and a short space of open linker DNA, ranging from around 0–80 base pairs. The key distinction between the structure of euchromatin and heterochromatin is that the nucleosomes in euchromatin are much more widely spaced, which allows for easier access of different protein complexes to the DNA strand and thus increased gene transcription.

== Appearance ==
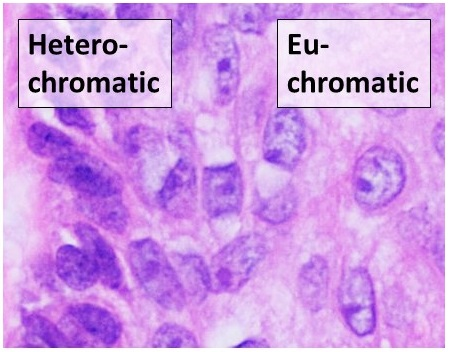
Microscopy of heterochromatic versus euchromatic nuclei (H&E stain).

Euchromatin resembles a set of beads on a string at large magnifications. From farther away, it can resemble a ball of tangled thread, such as in some electron microscope visualizations. In both optical and electron microscopic visualizations, euchromatin appears lighter in color than heterochromatin - which is also present in the nucleus and appears darkly - due to its less compact structure. When visualizing chromosomes, such as in a karyogram, cytogenetic banding is used to stain the chromosomes. Cytogenetic banding allows us to see which parts of the chromosome are made up of euchromatin or heterochromatin in order to differentiate chromosomal subsections, irregularities or rearrangements. One such example is G banding, otherwise known as Giemsa staining where euchromatin appears lighter than heterochromatin.

Appearance of Heterochromatin and Euchromatin Under Various Visualization Techniques
	Giemsa (G-) Banding	Reverse (R-) Banding	Constitutive Heterochromatin (C-) banding	Quinacrine (Q-) banding	Telomeric R (T-) banding
Euchromatin	Lighter	Darker	Lighter	Dull	Light
Heterochromatin	Darker	Lighter	Darker	Bright (Fluorescent)	Darker (Faint)

== Function ==
Schematic karyogram of a human, showing an overview of the human genome using G banding, which is a method that includes Giemsa staining, wherein the lighter staining regions are generally more euchromatic, whereas darker regions generally are more heterochromatic.

=== Transcription ===
Euchromatin participates in the active transcription of DNA to mRNA products. The unfolded structure allows gene regulatory proteins and RNA polymerase complexes to bind to the DNA sequence, which can then initiate the transcription process. While not all euchromatin is necessarily transcribed, as the euchromatin is divided into transcriptionally active and inactive domains, euchromatin is still generally associated with active gene transcription. There is therefore a direct link to how actively productive a cell is and the amount of euchromatin that can be found in its nucleus.

It is thought that the cell uses transformation from euchromatin into heterochromatin as a method of controlling gene expression and replication, since such processes behave differently on densely compacted chromatin. This is known as the 'accessibility hypothesis'. One example of constitutive euchromatin that is 'always turned on' is housekeeping genes, which code for the proteins needed for basic functions of cell survival.

=== Epigenetics ===
Epigenetics involves changes in the phenotype that can be inherited without changing the DNA sequence. This can occur through many types of environmental interactions. Regarding euchromatin, post-translational modifications of the histones can alter the structure of chromatin, resulting in altered gene expression without changing the DNA. Additionally, a loss of heterochromatin and increase in euchromatin has been shown to correlate with an accelerated aging process, especially in diseases known to resemble premature aging. Research has shown epigenetic markers on histones for a number of additional diseases.

== Regulation ==
Euchromatin is primarily regulated by post-translational modifications to its nucleosomes' histones, conducted by many histone-modifying enzymes. These modifications occur on the histones' N-terminal tails that protrude from the nucleosome structure, and are thought of to recruit enzymes to either keep the chromatin in its open form, as euchromatin, or in its closed form, as heterochromatin. Histone acetylation, for instance, is typically associated with euchromatin structure, whereas histone methylation promotes heterochromatin remodeling. Acetylation makes the histone group more negatively charged, which in turn disrupts its interactions with the DNA strand, essentially "opening" the strand for easier access. Acetylation can occur on multiple lysine residues of a histone's N-terminal tail and in different histones of the same nucleosome, which is thought to further increase DNA accessibility for transcription factors.

Phosphorylation of histones is another method by which euchromatin is regulated. This tends to occur on the N-terminal tails of the histones, however some sites are present in the core. Phosphorylation is controlled by kinases and phosphatases, which add and remove the phosphate groups respectively. This can occur at serine, threonine, or tyrosine residues present in euchromatin. Since the phosphate groups added to the structure will incorporate a negative charge, it will promote the more relaxed "open" form, similar to acetylation. In regards to functionality, histone phosphorylation is involved with gene expression, DNA damage repair, and chromatin remodeling.

Another method of regulation that incorporates a negative charge, thereby favoring the "open" form, is ADP ribosylation. This process adds one or more ADP-ribose units to the histone, and is involved in the DNA damage response pathway.

== See also ==
- Histone modifying enzymes
- Constitutive heterochromatin
