= Proline isomerization in epigenetics =

In epigenetics, proline isomerization is the effect that cis-trans isomerization of the amino acid proline has on the regulation of gene expression. Similar to aspartic acid, the amino acid proline has the rare property of being able to occupy both cis and trans isomers of its prolyl peptide bonds with ease. Peptidyl-prolyl isomerase, or PPIase, is an enzyme very commonly associated with proline isomerization due to their ability to catalyze the isomerization of prolines. PPIases are present in three types: cyclophilins, FK506-binding proteins, and the parvulins. PPIase enzymes catalyze the transition of proline between cis and trans isomers and are essential to the numerous biological functions controlled and affected by prolyl isomerization (i.e. cell signalling, protein folding, and epigenetic modifications) Without PPIases, prolyl peptide bonds will slowly switch between cis and trans isomers, a process that can lock proteins in a nonnative structure that can render the protein temporarily ineffective. Although this switch can occur on its own, PPIases are responsible for most isomerization of prolyl peptide bonds. The specific amino acid that precedes the prolyl peptide bond also can have an effect on which conformation the bond assumes. For instance, when an aromatic amino acid is bonded to a proline the bond is more favorable to the cis conformation. Cyclophilin A uses an "electrostatic handle" to pull proline into cis and trans formations. Most of these biological functions are affected by the isomerization of proline when one isomer interacts differently than the other, commonly causing an activation/deactivation relationship. As an amino acid, proline is present in many proteins. This aids in the multitude of effects that isomerization of proline can have in different biological mechanisms and functions.

== Cell signaling ==
Cell signaling involves many different processes and proteins. One of the most studied cell signaling phenomena involving proline is the interactions with p53 and prolyl isomerases, specifically Pin1. The protein p53, along with p63 and p73, are responsible for ensuring that alterations to the genome are corrected and for preventing the formation and growth of tumors. proline residues are found throughout the p53 proteins and without the phosphorylation and isomerization of specific Serine/Threonine-Proline motifs within p53, they cannot exhibit control over their target genes. The main signalling processes that are affected by p53 are apoptosis and cell cycle arrest, both of which are controlled by specific isomerization of the prolines in p53.

== History and discovery ==
Although isomerization of proteins has been known about since 1968 when it was discovered by C. Tanford, proline isomerization and its use as a noncovalent histone tail modification was not discovered until 2006 by Nelson and his colleagues.

== As a histone tail modification ==
One of the most well known epigenetic mechanisms that proline isomerization plays a role in is the modification of histone tails, specifically those of histone H3. Fpr4 is a PPIase, in the FK507BP group, that exhibits catalytic activity at the proline positions 16, 30, and 38 (also written P16, P30, and P38 respectively) on the N-terminal region of histone H3 in Saccharomyces cerevisiae. Fpr4's binding affinity is strongest at the P38 site, followed by P30 and then P16. However the catalytic efficiency, or the increase in isomerization rates, is highest at P16 and P30 equally, followed by P38 which exhibits a very small change in isomerization rates with the binding of Fpr4. Histone H3 has an important lysine residue at the 36 position (also written K36) on the N-terminal tail which can be methylated by Set2, a methyltransferase. Methylation of K36 is key to normal transcription elongation. Due to P38's proximity to K36, cross-talk between P38 isomerization and K36 methylation can occur. This means that isomer changes at the P38 position can affect methylation at the K36 position. In the cis position, P38 shifts the histone tail closer to the DNA, crowding the area around the tail. This can cause a decrease the ability of proteins to bind to the DNA and to the histone tail, including preventing Set2 from methylating K36. Also, this tail movement can increase the number interactions between the histone tail and the DNA, increasing likelihood of nucleosome formation and potentially leading to the creation of higher-order chromatin structure. In trans, P38 leads to the opposite effects: allowing for Set2 to methylate K36. Set2 is only affected by isomerization of P38 when creating a trimethylated K36 (commonly written as K36me3), however, and not K36me2. Fpr4 also binds to P32 in H4, though its effects are minimal.

In mammalian cells, the isomerization of H3P30 interacts with the phosphorylation of H3S28 (serine in the 28 position of histone H3) and the methylation of H3K27. hFKBP25 is a PPIase that is a homolog for Fpr4 in mammalian cells and is found to commonly be associated with the presence of HDACs. Cyp33 is a cyclophilin that has the ability to isomerize H3 proline residues at P16 and P30 positions. Histones H2A and H2B also have multiple proline residues near amino acids that when modified affect the activity surrounding the histone.

=== Interactions with H3K4me3 and H3K14ac ===
The isomerization of the peptide bond between histone H3's alanine 15 and proline 16 is affected by the acetylation at K14 and can control the methylation states of K4. K4me3 represses gene transcription and depends upon the Set1 methyltransferase complex subunit Spp1 being balanced with the Jhd2 demethylases for proper function. Acetylation of K14 allows for a state change in P16 and primarily promotes the trans state of P16. This trans isomer of P16 reduces K4 methylation, which results in transcription repression. Isomerization of P16 has downstream effects of controlling protein binding to acetylated K18. When P16 is in the trans conformation, Spt7 is allowed to bind to K18ac, increasing transcription.

== Interactions with gene regulatory proteins ==
=== RNA polymerase II ===
Proline isomerization of certain prolines in RNA polymerase II is key in the process of recruiting and placing processing factors during transcription. PPIases target RNA polymerase II by interacting with the Rpb1 carboxy terminal domain, or CTD. Proline isomerization is then used as part of the mechanism of the CTD to recruit co-factors required for co-transcriptional RNA processing, regulating RNA polymerase II activity. Nrd1 is a protein that is responsible for many of the transcriptional activities of RNAP II, specifically through the Nrd1- dependent termination pathway. This pathway requires the parvulin Ess1, or Pin1 depending on the organism, to isomerize the pSer5-Pro6 bond in the CTD. Without the cis conformation of the pSer5-Pro6 bond, created by Ess1/Pin1, Nrd1 cannot bind to RNAP II. Any variation from this process leads to a decrease in Nrd1 binding affinity, lowering the ability of RNAP II to process and degrade noncoding RNAs.

=== MLL1 ===
Cyp33 in mammals causes isomerization in MLL1. MLL1 is a multiprotein complex that regulates gene expression and chromosomal translocations involving this gene often lead to leukemia. MLL's target genes include HOXC8, HOXA9, CDKN1B, and C-MYC. MLL also has two binding domains: a Cyp33 RNA-recognition motif domain (RRM), and a PHD3 domain that binds to H3K4me3 or Cyp33 RRM. Cyp33 has the ability to downregulate the expression of these genes through proline isomerization at the peptide bond between His1628 and Pro1629 within MLL. This bond lies in a sequence between the PHD3 finger of MLL1 and the bromeodomain of MLL1, and its isomerization mediates the bonding of the PHD3 domain and the Cyp33 RRM domain. When these two domains are bonded transcription is repressed through recruitment of histone deacetylases to MLL1 and inhibition of H3K4me3.

=== Phosphatase recruitment ===
Phosphorylated amino acids are crucial for the modulation of the binding of transcription factors and other gene regulatory proteins. Pin1's effect on isomerization of proline residues leads to an increase or decrease in recruitment of phosphatases, namely Scp1 and Ssu72 and their recruitment to the RNAP II CTD. The cis-Pro formation is associated with an increase in Ssu72. Scp1 on recognizes trans-Pro formations, and is not affected by such isomerization. Pin1 also triggers the activation of the DSIF complex and NELF, which are responsible for pausing RNAP II in mammalian cells, and their conversion into positive elongation factors, facilitating elongation. This potentially could be an isomerization dependent process.

== Regulation of mRNA stability ==
Pin1, a parvulin, regulates mRNA stability and expression in certain eukaryotics mRNAs. These mRNAs are GM-CSF, Pth, and TGFβ and each of them have AREs, or AU-rich cis-elements. The ARE binding protein KSRP has a Pin1 binding site. Pin1 binds to this site and dephosphorylates the serine and isomerizes the peptide bond between Ser181 and Pro182. This isomerization causes the decay of Pth mRNA. KSRP, and other ARE binding proteins like AUF1, are thought to affect the other mRNAs through mechanisms similar to Pth, with the requirement of a phosphorylated serine bonded to a proline in a specific conformation. Pin1 also triggers proline isomerization of Stem-Loop Binding Protein (SLBP), allowing it to control the dissociation of SLBP from histone mRNA. This leads to Pin1 being able to affect histone mRNA decay. Pin1 affects many other genes in the form of gene silencing through the disruption of cell pathways, making it important in mRNA turnover by modulating RNA binding protein activity.

== Difficulties with research ==
Currently there are no existing compounds that can mimic the peptide bond of proline to other amino acids while maintaining only a cis or trans configuration because most mimics found will eventually change from one isomer to another. This makes research on the direct effect of each of the isomers on biological mechanisms more difficult. Also, the actual isomerization of proline is a slow process, meaning that any studying of the effects of the different isomers of proline takes a large amount of time to complete.
