= SMC4 =

Protein-coding gene in humans

Identifiers
- Aliases: SMC4, CAP-C, CAPC, SMC-4, SMC4L1, hCAP-C, structural maintenance of chromosomes 4
- External IDs: OMIM: 605575; MGI: 1917349; GeneCards: SMC4
Available structures
PDB	Ortholog search: PDBe RCSB
PDB	List of PDB id codes 4U4P

Gene location (Human)
Chr.	Chromosome 3 (human)
Band	3q25.33	Start	160,399,274 bp
Band	3q25.33	End	160,434,954 bp

Gene location (Mouse)
Chr.	Chromosome 3 (mouse)
Band	3|3 E1	Start	68,912,071 bp
Band	3|3 E1	End	68,941,956 bp
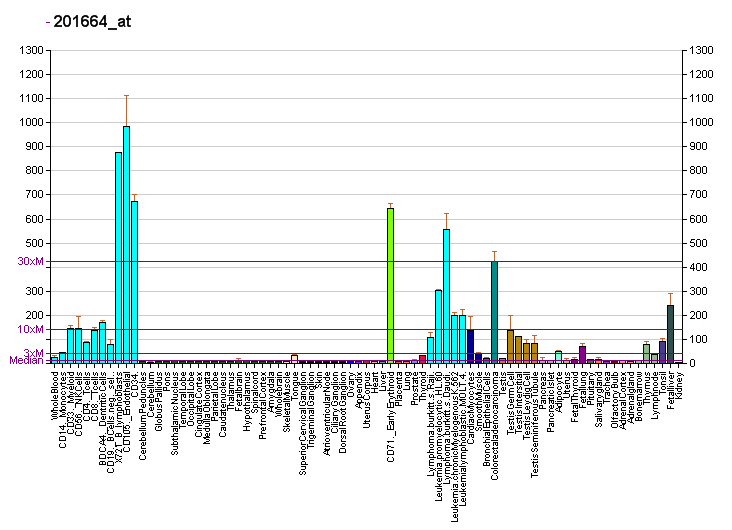

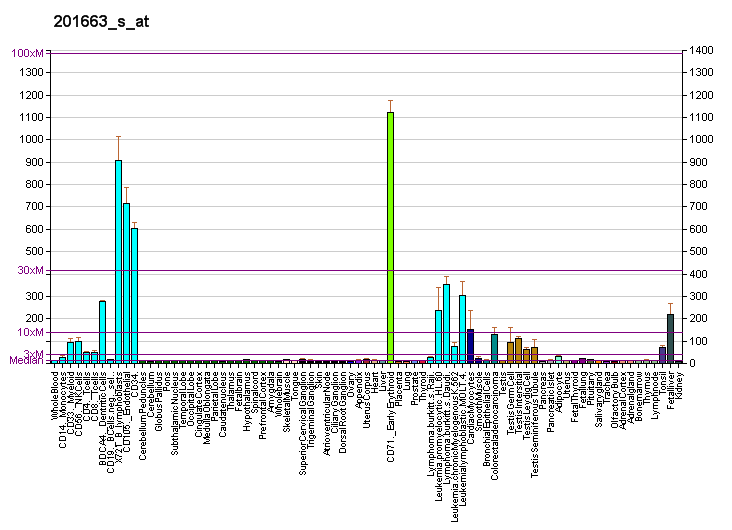
RNA expression pattern
Bgee	Human / Mouse (ortholog); Top expressed in: ventricular zone; ganglionic eminence; trabecular bone; testicle; bone marrow cell; gonad; right testis; Achilles tendon; left testis; right coronary artery / Top expressed in: human fetus; primary oocyte; tibiofemoral joint; fetal liver hematopoietic progenitor cell; spermatocyte; thymus; tail of embryo; maxillary prominence; migratory enteric neural crest cell; dermis; More reference expression data
BioGPS	More reference expression data
Gene ontology
Molecular function	protein heterodimerization activity; nucleotide binding; protein binding; ATP binding; single-stranded DNA binding
Cellular component	chromosome; nucleus; condensin complex; nucleoplasm; cytoplasm; cytosol; nuclear speck
Biological process	mitotic sister chromatid segregation; meiotic chromosome segregation; cell division; cell cycle; kinetochore organization; mitotic chromosome condensation; meiotic chromosome condensation; chromosome condensation; chromosome organization
Sources:Amigo / QuickGO
Orthologs
Databases	NCBI: entry; OMA: entry
Species	Human	Mouse
Entrez	10051	70099
Ensembl	ENSG00000113810	ENSMUSG00000034349
UniProt	Q9NTJ3	Q8CG47
RefSeq (mRNA)	NM_001002799; NM_001002800; NM_001288753; NM_005496	NM_133786; NM_001356976
RefSeq (protein)	NP_001002800; NP_001275682; NP_005487	NP_598547; NP_001343905
Location (UCSC)	Chr 3: 160.4 – 160.43 Mb	Chr 3: 68.91 – 68.94 Mb
PubMed search
- Wikidata
View/Edit Human	View/Edit Mouse

Structural maintenance of chromosomes protein 4 (SMC-4) also known as chromosome-associated polypeptide C (CAP-C) or XCAP-C homolog is a protein that in humans is encoded by the SMC4 gene. SMC-4 is a core subunit of condensin I and II, large protein complexes involved in high order chromosome organization, including condensation and segregation. SMC-4 protein is commonly associated with the SMC-2 protein, another protein complex within the SMC protein family. SMC-4 dimerizes with SMC-2, creating the flexible and dynamic structure of the condensin holocomplex. An over-expression of the SMC-4 protein is shown to impact carcinogenesis.

== Structure and interactions ==
Structure of a condensin protein holocomplex, displaying the SMC-4/SMC-2 heterodimer, and additional subunits. Kleisin is also depicted (blue).

The primary 5 domain structure of SMC proteins is highly conserved among species. The basic structure of SMC proteins are characterized by a non-helical hinge group, separated by two anti-parallel α-helical coiled-coil domains, along with two Amino-terminal globular domains containing ATP hydrolytic sites, or nucleotide-binding motifs located at the C-terminus and N-terminus called the Walker A and Walker B motifs.

In eukaryotes, dimerization is mediated by the self-folding of the non-helical hinge group on the SMC protein. Dimerization occurs at the non-helical hinge group of SMC-4, which then associates with the non-helical hinge group of SMC-2, creating a V-shaped heterodimeric structure. The holocomplex of condensin contains the SMC-4 and SMC-2 heterodimer subunits, along with 3 other non-SMC subunits, CAP-D2, CAP-G, and CAP-H.

In the condensin holocomplex, a protein subunit called kleisin joins the C-terminus and N-terminus ATPase end domains of both SMC-4 and SMC-2 proteins. when the condensin holocomplex is bound with ATP at these end domains, the condensin will assume a "closed" conformation state. SMC-4 is a dynamic and flexible protein, allowing different domain components to occasionally interact with others. This is speculated to be involved in the mechanical ability of the complex when associated with chromosomes. In budding yeast, these interactions may result in open "O" appearances, or collapsed B-shaped states as a result of its dynamic ability.

== Clinical significance ==
The SMC-4 protein is associated with abnormal cell and tumor growth, and involved with migration and invasion. In general, the presence of over-expressed SMC-4 proteins is thought to be correlated with carcinogenesis.

It is found that an over-expression or down-regulation of the SMC-4 protein alters TGFβ/Smad signaling pathways in glioma cells. SMC-4-transduced glioma cells showed activation of the TGFβ/Smad signaling pathway which was not present in SMC-4 silenced glioma cells. This pathway was shown to be correlated with an "aggressive" behavioral phenotype in glioma cells. An over-expression of SMC-4 can induce a higher rate of proliferation, and ultimately increased invasive capability. A down-regulation of SMC-4 reduced this quality.

The SMC-4 protein is involved with normal lung development however, adenocarcinoma lung tissue shows an over-expression of SMC-4. additionally, SMC-4 may act as independent prognostic factor for carcinogenesis and lung adenocarcinoma.

Studies suggest that over-expression of the SMC-4 protein in human liver tissue may be correlated with progression of hepatocellular carcinoma.
