= Histone H1 =

Components of chromatin in eukaryotic cells

linker histone H1 and H5 family
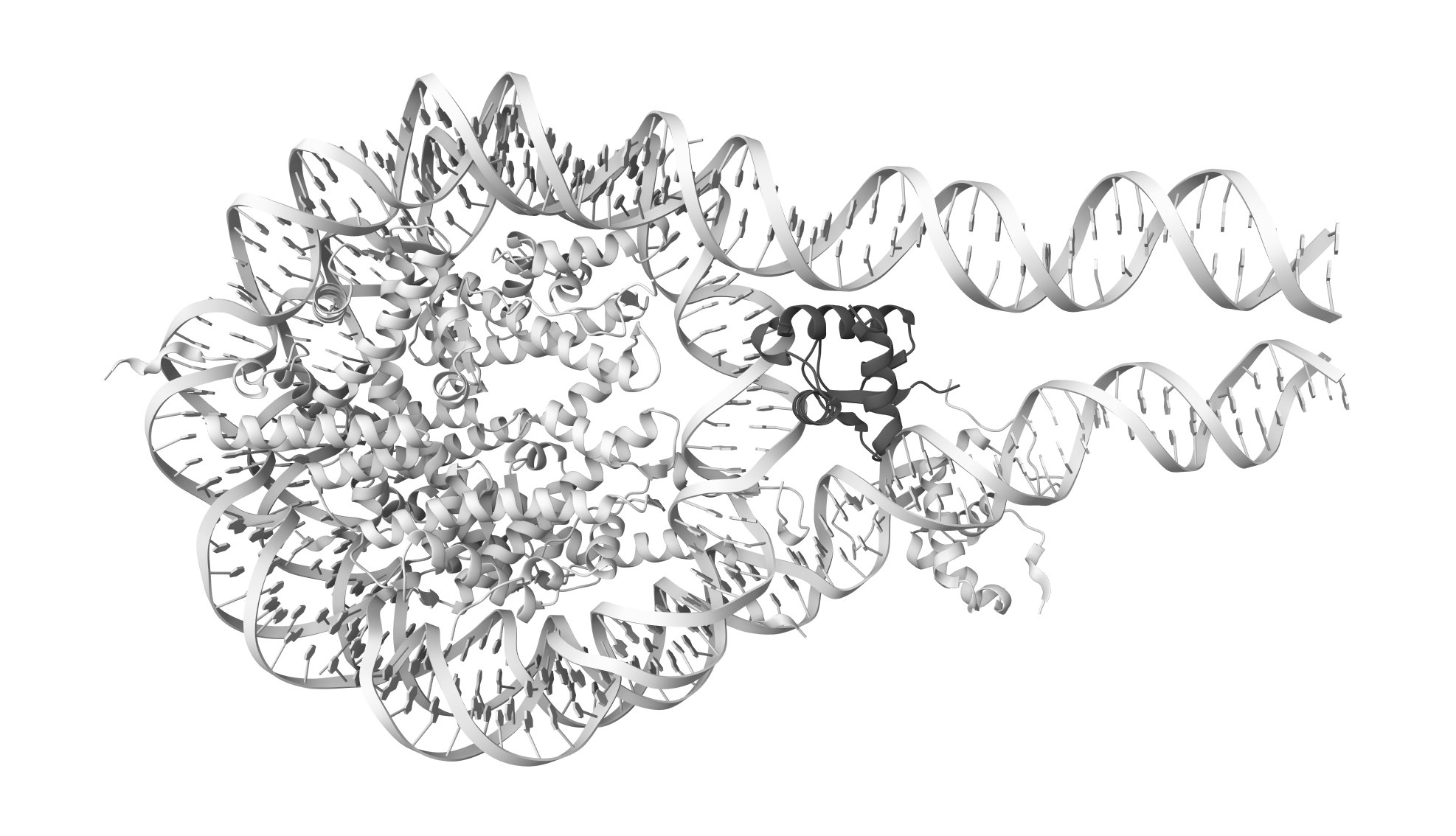
- Histone H1.4 within a human nucleosome

Identifiers
- Symbol: Linker_histone
- Pfam: PF00538
- InterPro: IPR005818
- SMART: SM00526
- SCOP2: 1hst / SCOPe / SUPFAM
Available protein structures:
- PDB: 1ghc, 1hst, 1uhm, 1uss, 1ust, 1yqa IPR005818 PF00538 (ECOD; PDBsum)
- AlphaFold: IPR005818; PF00538

Histone H1 is one of the five main histone protein families which are components of chromatin in eukaryotic cells. Though highly conserved, it is nevertheless the most variable histone in sequence across species.

== Structure ==
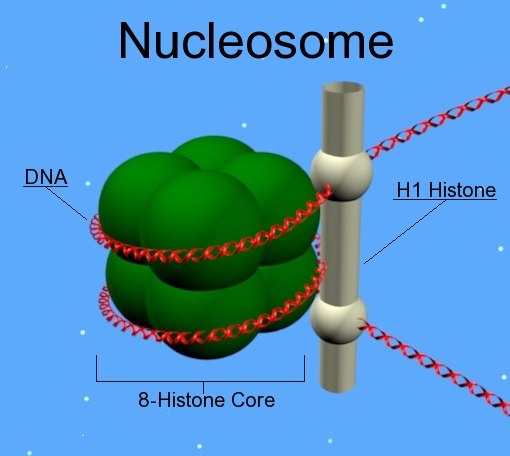
A diagram showing where H1 can be found in the nucleosome

Metazoan H1 proteins feature a central globular "winged helix" domain and long C- and short N-terminal tails. H1 is involved with the packing of the "beads on a string" sub-structures into a high order structure, whose details have not yet been solved. H1 found in protists and bacteria, otherwise known as nucleoproteins HC1 and HC2 (Pfam PF07432, PF07382), lack the central domain and the N-terminal tail.

H1 is less conserved than core histones. The globular domain is the most conserved part of H1.

== Function ==
Unlike the other histones, H1 does not make up the nucleosome "bead". Instead, it sits on top of the structure, keeping in place the DNA that has wrapped around the nucleosome. H1 is present in half the amount of the other four histones, which contribute two molecules to each nucleosome bead. In addition to binding to the nucleosome, the H1 protein binds to the linker DNA (approximately 20-80 nucleotides in length) region between nucleosomes, helping stabilize the zig-zagged 30 nm chromatin fiber. Much has been learned about histone H1 from studies on purified chromatin fibers. Ionic extraction of linker histones from native or reconstituted chromatin promotes its unfolding under hypotonic conditions from fibers of 30 nm width to beads-on-a-string nucleosome arrays.

It is uncertain whether H1 promotes a solenoid-like chromatin fiber, in which exposed linker DNA is shortened, or whether it merely promotes a change in the angle of adjacent nucleosomes, without affecting linker length However, linker histones have been demonstrated to drive the compaction of chromatin fibres that had been reconstituted in vitro using synthetic DNA arrays of the strong '601' nucleosome positioning element. Nuclease digestion and DNA footprinting experiments suggest that the globular domain of histone H1 localizes near the nucleosome dyad, where it protects approximately 15-30 base pairs of additional DNA. In addition, experiments on reconstituted chromatin reveal a characteristic stem motif at the dyad in the presence of H1. Despite gaps in our understanding, a general model has emerged wherein H1's globular domain closes the nucleosome by crosslinking incoming and outgoing DNA, while the tail binds to linker DNA and neutralizes its negative charge.

Many experiments addressing H1 function have been performed on purified, processed chromatin under low-salt conditions, but H1's role in vivo is less certain. Cellular studies have shown that overexpression of H1 can cause aberrant nuclear morphology and chromatin structure, and that H1 can serve as both a positive and negative regulator of transcription, depending on the gene. In Xenopus egg extracts, linker histone depletion causes ~2-fold lengthwise extension of mitotic chromosomes, while overexpression causes chromosomes to hypercompact into an inseparable mass. Complete knockout of H1 in vivo has not been achieved in multicellular organisms due to the existence of multiple isoforms that may be present in several gene clusters, but various linker histone isoforms have been depleted to varying degrees in Tetrahymena, C. elegans, Arabidopsis, fruit fly, and mouse, resulting in various organism-specific defects in nuclear morphology, chromatin structure, DNA methylation, and/or specific gene expression.

== Dynamics ==
While most histone H1 in the nucleus is bound to chromatin, H1 molecules shuttle between chromatin regions at a fairly high rate.

It is difficult to understand how such a dynamic protein could be a structural component of chromatin, but it has been suggested that the steady-state equilibrium within the nucleus still strongly favors association between H1 and chromatin, meaning that despite its dynamics, the vast majority of H1 at any given timepoint is chromatin bound. H1 compacts and stabilizes DNA under force and during chromatin assembly, which suggests that dynamic binding of H1 may provide protection for DNA in situations where nucleosomes need to be removed.

Cytoplasmic factors appear to be necessary for the dynamic exchange of histone H1 on chromatin, but these have yet to be specifically identified. H1 dynamics may be mediated to some degree by O-glycosylation and phosphorylation. O-glycosylation of H1 may promote chromatin condensation and compaction. Phosphorylation during interphase has been shown to decrease H1 affinity for chromatin and may promote chromatin decondensation and active transcription. However, during mitosis phosphorylation has been shown to increase the affinity of H1 for chromosomes and therefore promote mitotic chromosome condensation.

== Isoforms ==
The H1 family in animals includes multiple linker histone H1 variants. Variants or isoforms that can be expressed in different or overlapping tissues and developmental stages within a single organism. The reason for these multiple isoforms remains unclear, but both their evolutionary conservation from sea urchin to humans as well as significant differences in their amino acid sequences suggest that they are not functionally equivalent. One isoform histone H5, is only found in avian red blood cells, which unlike those in mammals are nucleated. Another isoform is the oocyte/zygotic H1M isoform (also known as B4 or H1foo), found in sea urchins, frogs, mice, and humans, which is replaced in the embryo by somatic isoforms H1A-E, and H10 which resembles H5. Despite having more negative charges than somatic isoforms, H1M binds with higher affinity to mitotic chromosomes in Xenopus egg extracts.

== Post-translational modifications ==
Like other histones, the histone H1 family is extensively post-translationally modified (PTM). This includes serine and threonine phosphorylation, lysine acetylation, lysine methylation and ubiquitination. These PTMs serve a variety of functions but are less well studied than the PTMs of other histones.

== See also ==
- Other histone proteins involved in chromatin:
  - H2A
  - H2B
  - H3
  - H4
