= Chromatin =

Complex of DNA and protein in eukaryotic cells

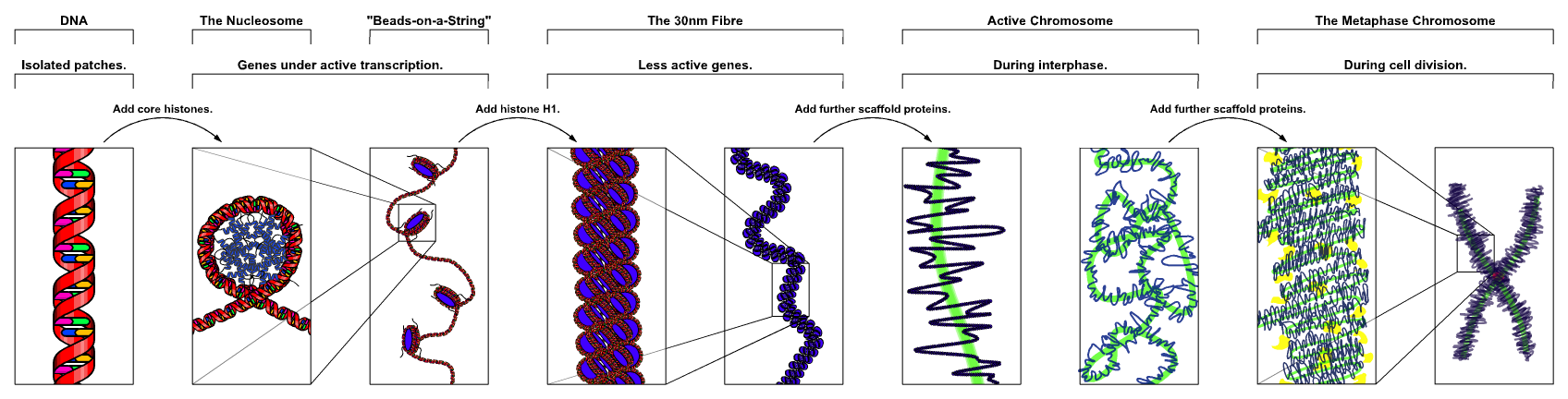
The major structures in DNA compaction: DNA, the nucleosome, the 11 nm beads on a string chromatin fibre and the metaphase chromosome.

Chromatin is a complex of DNA and protein responsible for condensing and packaging chromosomal DNA. Chromatin is found in both bacterial and eukaryotic cells.

Eukaryotic chromatin consists primarily of DNA associated with histone proteins and numerous other chromatin-binding factors that contribute to genome organization and regulation. Chromatin packages long DNA molecules into compact structures while controlling access to genetic information for processes such as transcription, DNA replication, and DNA repair. During cell division, chromatin facilitates proper segregation of chromosomes in anaphase; the characteristic shapes of chromosomes visible during this stage are the result of DNA being coiled into highly condensed chromatin.

Chromatin organization is often described at several structural levels. At the most basic level, DNA wrapped around histone octamers forms nucleosomes connected by stretches of linker DNA, producing a structure sometimes referred to as a "beads-on-a-string" fiber approximately 10–11 nm in diameter. Nucleosome arrays can interact with each other and with linker histones to form higher-order chromatin structures. 30-nm chromatin fiber has been observed in vitro, although its presence and prevalence in living cells remain debated.

At larger genomic scales, chromatin is organized into loops and domains that contribute to the three-dimensional architecture of the genome. Chromosomes are further partitioned into compartments associated with active (euchromatin) or inactive (heterochromatin) chromatin states, and individual chromosomes occupy distinct spatial regions within the nucleus known as chromosome territories.

Many organisms exhibit variations in chromatin organization. For example, spermatozoa and avian red blood cells have more tightly packed chromatin than most eukaryotic cells. In contrast, some protozoa such as trypanosomatid do not DNA condense their chromatin into visible chromosomes at all.

Bacteria organize their DNA differently, forming a chromatin or nucleoid structure organized by nucleoid-associated proteins including H-NS and StpA. Some archaeal species encode histone proteins, and package DNA into nucleosome-like assemblies of variable size, sometimes referred to as hypernucleosomes.

Chromatin organization also varies throughout the cell cycle. During interphase, chromatin is generally less condensed, allowing access to RNA and DNA polymerases that transcribe and replicate the DNA. The local structure of chromatin during interphase depends on the specific genes present in the DNA.

During mitosis and meiosis, chromatin becomes highly compacted to facilitate the segregation of chromosomes. Within interphase nuclei, genomic regions differ in their degree of compaction and transcriptional activity. Actively transcribed regions are often associated with less condensed chromatin known as euchromatin, whereas transcriptionally inactive or repressed regions are frequently enriched in more compact heterochromatin. Chemical modifications of chromatin components, often so-called epigenetic modification, including histone tails methylation and acetylation also alters local chromatin structure and therefore gene expression.

== Basic chromatin structure ==
=== Nucleosomes ===
The primary protein components of chromatin are histones. Nucleosome, the fundamental basic unit of chromatin, consists of DNA wrapped around a histone octamer containing two copies each of the core histones Histone H2A, Histone H2B, Histone H3, and Histone H4. Approximately 147 base pairs of DNA wrap around this histone octamer to form the nucleosome core particle.

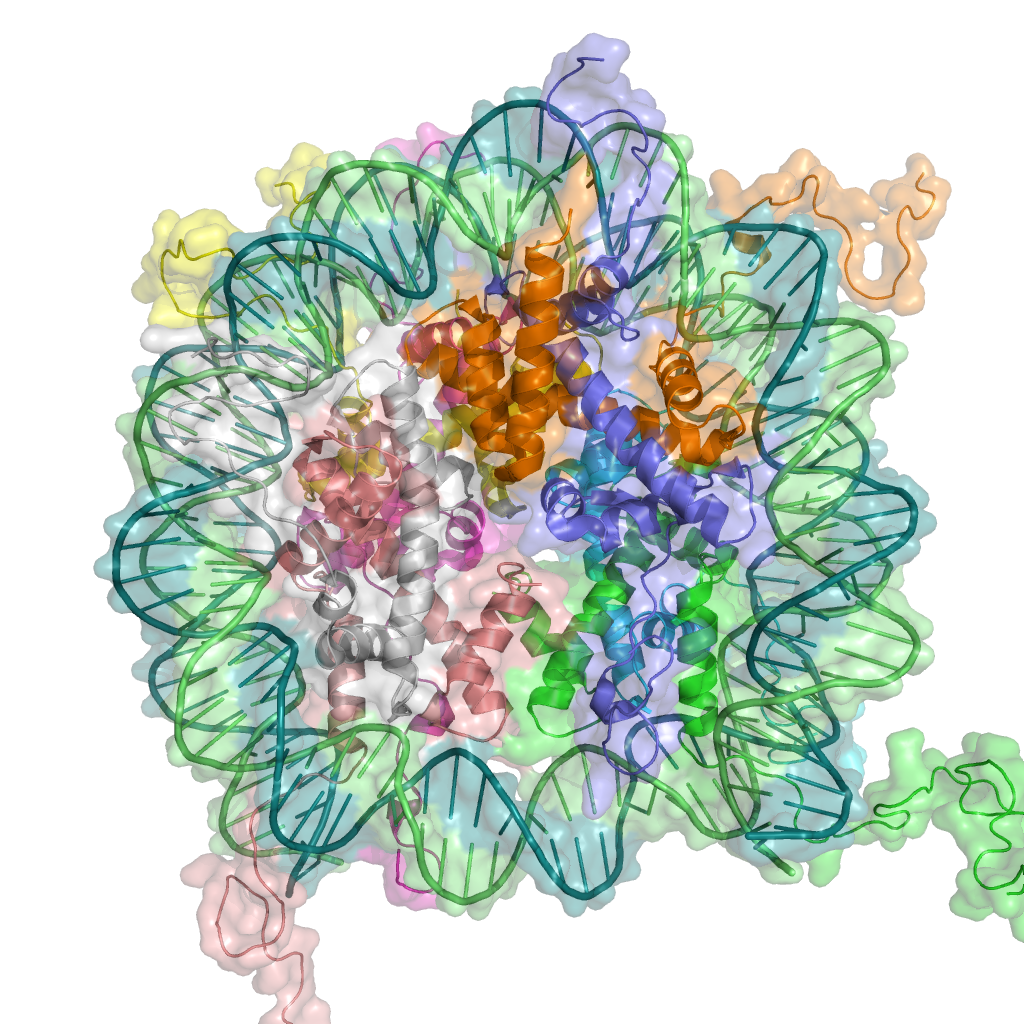
A cartoon representation of the nucleosome structure. From PDB: 1KX5.

Neighboring nucleosomes are connected by stretches of linker DNA, which vary in length among organisms and cell types but typically range from about 20 to 60 base pairs. Arrays of nucleosomes connected by linker DNA form an extended fiber often described as a "beads-on-a-string" structure approximately 10–11 nm in diameter under low-salt or experimentally reconstituted conditions.

In addition to core histones, a linker histone H1 binds near the entry and exit sites of DNA on the nucleosome and contributes to higher-order chromatin organization. The nucleosome core particle, together with histone H1, is known as a chromatosome.

The nucleosomes bind DNA non-specifically, as required by their function in general DNA packaging. There are, however, large DNA sequence preferences that govern nucleosome positioning. This is due primarily to the varying physical properties of different DNA sequences: For instance, adenine (A), and thymine (T) is more favorably compressed into the inner minor grooves. This means nucleosomes can bind preferentially at one position approximately every 10 base pairs (the helical repeat of DNA)- where the DNA is rotated to maximize the number of A and T bases that will lie in the inner minor groove (see nucleic acid structure).

=== Historical 30-nm fiber model ===
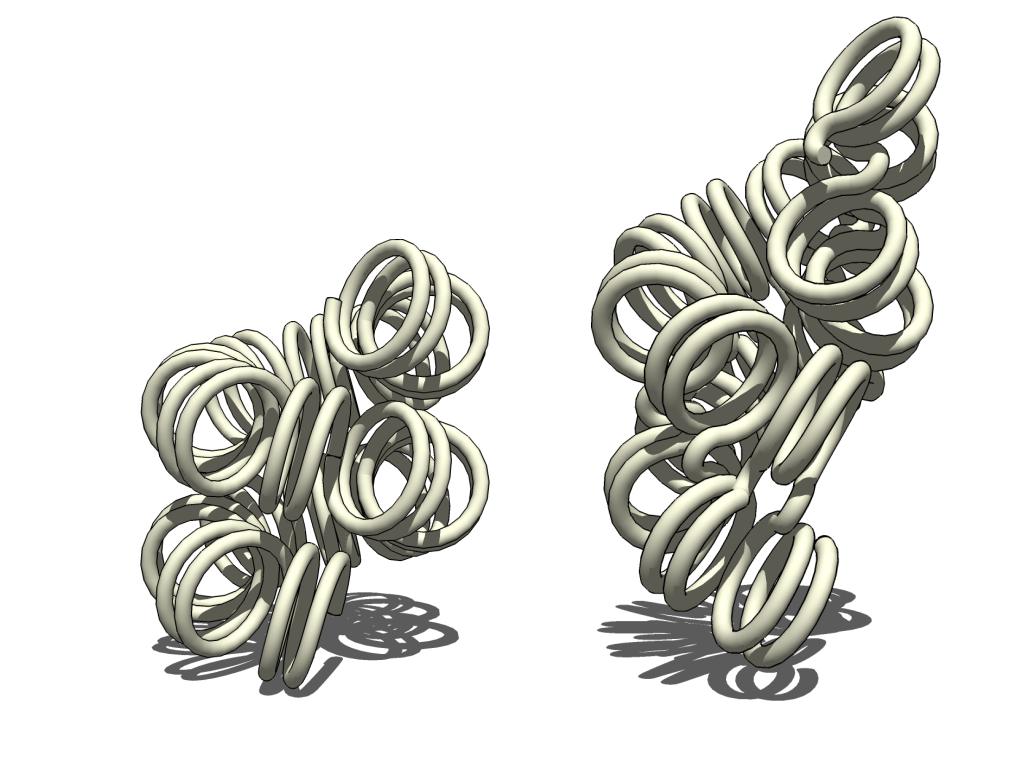
"solenoid" structure and loose helix structure of historical 30 nm fiber

Under certain experimental conditions, nucleosome arrays can fold into more compact structures with diameters of approximately 30 nm. Early models proposed that chromatin fibers adopt regular helical arrangements, including a one-start solenoid model and a two-start zigzag model.

However, the existence of a uniform 30-nm chromatin fiber in living cells remains debated. Studies using cryo-electron microscopy and other high-resolution imaging methods have suggested that chromatin in many cell types forms irregular and dynamic nucleosome assemblies rather than regular 30-nm fibers.

== Three-dimensional genome organization ==
see Nuclear organization

the structure of chromatin within a chromosome

=== Chromatin loops ===
Animated representation of the dynamic formation of chromatin loops through CTCF (red) and condensin rings (yellow)

The beads-on-a-string chromatin structure has a tendency to form loops. These loops allow interactions between different regions of DNA by bringing them closer to each other, which increases the efficiency of gene interactions. This process is dynamic, with loops forming and disappearing. The loops are regulated by two main elements:

- Cohesins, protein complexes that generate loops by extrusion of the DNA fiber through the ring-like structure of the complex itself.
- CTCF, a transcription factor that limits the frontier of the DNA loop. To stop the growth of a loop, two CTCF molecules must be positioned in opposite directions to block the movement of the cohesin ring (see video).

There are many other elements involved. For example, Jpx regulates the binding sites of CTCF molecules along the DNA fiber.

=== TADs ===
see Topologically associating domain

=== Chromatin compartments ===
Chromatin compartments are large-scale structural domains of the genome that reflect the segregation of chromatin with similar transcriptional and epigenetic properties. Genome-wide chromosome conformation capture experiments have revealed that chromosomes are partitioned into at least two major compartment types, commonly referred to as A and B compartments. A compartments are generally enriched in transcriptionally active chromatin, open chromatin marks, and gene-rich regions, whereas B compartments are associated with transcriptionally inactive chromatin, heterochromatin, and interactions with nuclear structures such as the nuclear lamina. These compartments represent preferential long-range interactions between genomic regions with similar chromatin states and contribute to the spatial organization of chromosomes within the nucleus.

=== Chromosome territories ===
see Chromosome territories

== Chromatin dynamics and regulation ==
=== Histone modifications ===
Basic units of chromatin structure

Chromatin structure is highly dynamic and changes throughout the cell cycle and in response to cellular signals. Histone proteins play a central role in organizing chromatin and can undergo a wide range of post-translational modifications, including acetylation, methylation, phosphorylation, and ubiquitination (see histone modification). These modifications occur primarily on the flexible N-terminal tails of histones that extend outward from the nucleosome core.

The positively charged histone cores only partially counteract the negative charge of the DNA phosphate backbone resulting in a negative net charge of the overall structure. An imbalance of charge within the polymer causes electrostatic repulsion between neighboring chromatin regions that promote interactions with positively charged proteins, molecules, and cations. As these modifications occur, the electrostatic environment surrounding the chromatin will flux and the level of chromatin compaction will alter. The consequences in terms of chromatin accessibility and compaction depend both on the modified amino acid and the type of modification.

Different histone modifications are associated with distinct chromatin states. For example, histone acetylation is generally correlated with increased chromatin accessibility and active transcription, whereas certain histone methylation marks are associated with either transcriptional activation (trimethylation of histone H3 lysine 4) or repression (trimethylation of histone H3, lysine 9 or lysine 27) depending on the modified residue.

Multiple histone modifications can occur simultaneously on the same nucleosome, creating combinations of regulatory signals sometimes referred to as the histone code. For example, developmental genes in mammalian embryonic stem cells often carry both activating (H3K4me3) and repressive (H3K27me3) marks in a configuration known as bivalent structure, which is involved into cell fate transtition during early mammalian development.

Polycomb-group proteins play a role in regulating genes through modulation of chromatin structure.

Enzymes that add, remove, or recognize histone modifications are often described as chromatin writers, erasers, and readers, respectively. For additional information, see Chromatin variant, Histone modifications in chromatin regulation and RNA polymerase control by chromatin structure.

=== Chromatin remodeling ===
see Chromatin remodeling

=== Transcriptional bursting ===
Main page: Transcriptional bursting

Chromatin and its interaction with enzymes has been researched, and a conclusion being made is that it is relevant and an important factor in gene expression. Vincent G. Allfrey, a professor at Rockefeller University, stated that RNA synthesis is related to histone acetylation. The lysine amino acid attached to the end of the histones is positively charged. The acetylation of these tails would make the chromatin ends neutral, allowing for DNA access.

When the chromatin decondenses, the DNA is open to entry of molecular machinery. Fluctuations between open and closed chromatin may contribute to the discontinuity of transcription, or transcriptional bursting. Other factors are probably involved, such as the association and dissociation of transcription factor complexes with chromatin. Specifically, RNA polymerase and transcriptional proteins have been shown to congregate into droplets via phase separation, and recent studies have suggested that 10 nm chromatin demonstrates liquid-like behavior increasing the targetability of genomic DNA. The interactions between linker histones and disordered tail regions act as an electrostatic glue organizing large-scale chromatin into a dynamic, liquid-like domain. Decreased chromatin compaction comes with increased chromatin mobility and easier transcriptional access to DNA. The phenomenon, as opposed to simple probabilistic models of transcription, can account for the high variability in gene expression occurring between cells in isogenic populations.

=== Structure of DNA ===
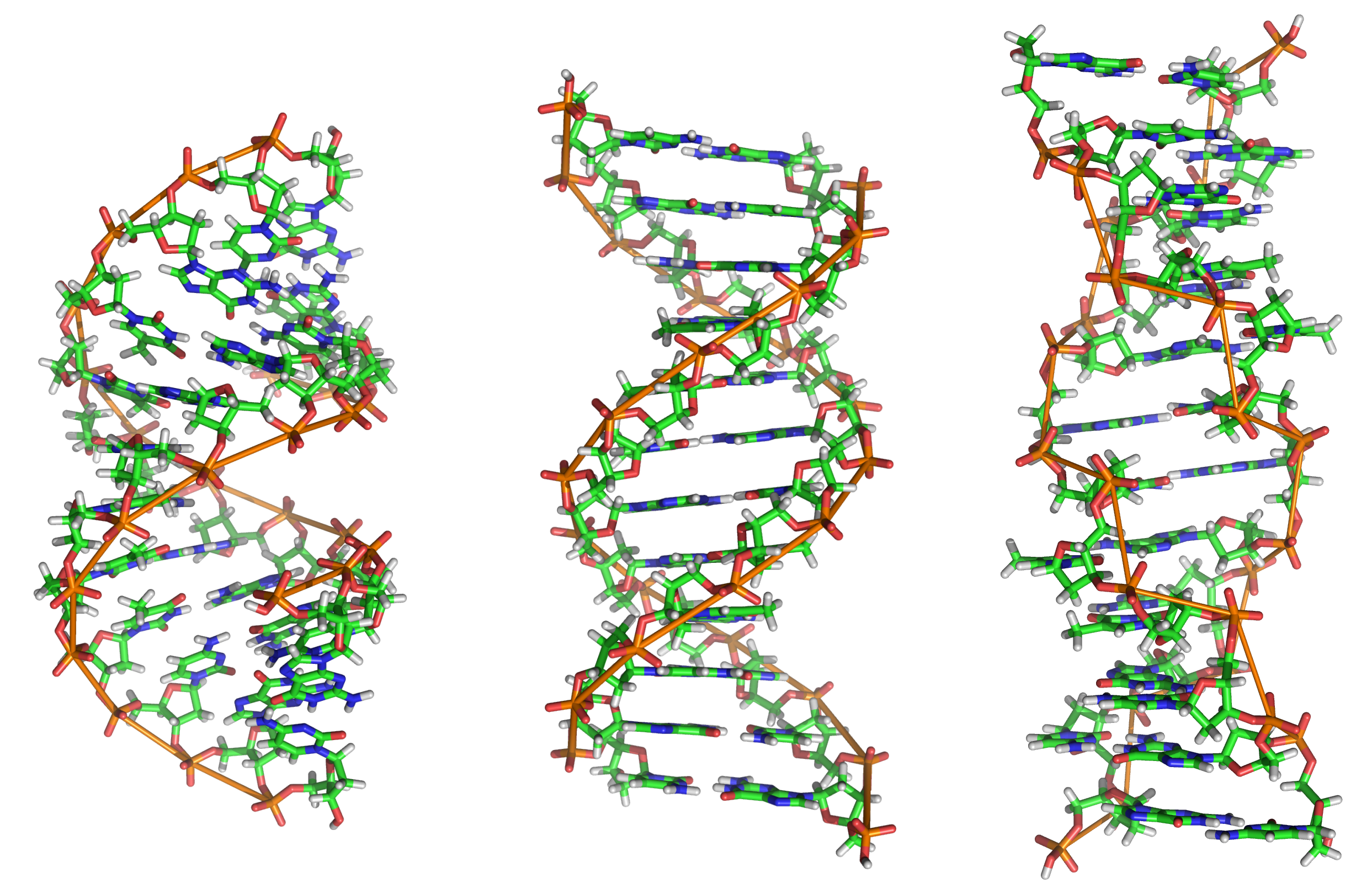
The structures of A-, B-, and Z-DNA.

DNA can adopt several conformations, most commonly referred to as A-, B-, and Z-DNA. B-DNA is the predominant form found under physiological conditions and is the canonical right-handed double helix described by Watson and Crick. A-DNA is also a right-handed helix but is more compact and is typically observed under dehydrating conditions or in certain DNA–RNA hybrid structures.

Z-DNA differs from these forms in that it is a left-handed helix with a zigzag backbone. Transitions between B-DNA and Z-DNA can occur in regions experiencing high torsional stress, such as those generated during transcription. Because of these properties, Z-DNA has been proposed to play roles in chromatin organization and gene regulation.

Local DNA sequence composition and structural flexibility influence how DNA interacts with histone proteins and other chromatin-associated factors. For example, sequences enriched in adenine and thymine can bend more easily, affecting nucleosome positioning along the genome.

== Chromatin during the cell cycle ==
=== Spatial organization of chromatin in the cell nucleus ===
The spatial arrangement of the chromatin within the nucleus is not random - specific regions of the chromatin can be found in certain territories. Territories are, for example, the lamina-associated domains (LADs), and the topologically associating domains (TADs), which are bound together by protein complexes. Polymer physics approaches have been widely used to model chromatin folding and genome organization. In particular, mechanisms such as loop extrusion, mediated by protein complexes including cohesin, have been proposed to explain the formation of chromatin loops and domain boundaries observed in chromosome conformation capture experiments.

=== Cell-cycle dependent structural organization ===
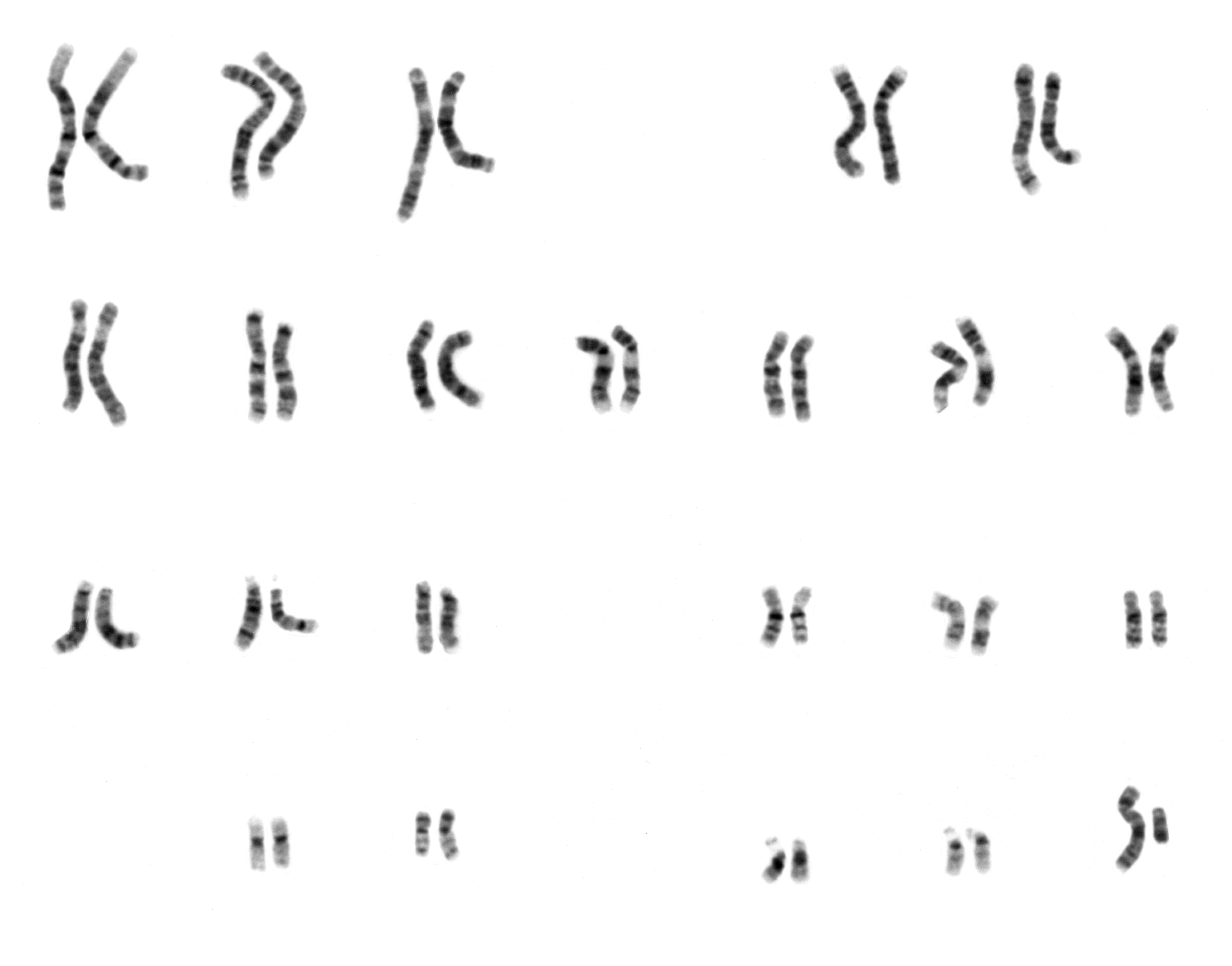
Karyogram of human male using Giemsa staining, showing the classic metaphase chromatin structure.

Condensation and resolution of human sister chromatids in early mitosis

1. Interphase: The structure of chromatin during interphase of mitosis is optimized to allow simple access of transcription and DNA repair factors to the DNA while compacting the DNA into the nucleus. The structure varies depending on the access required to the DNA. Genes that require regular access by RNA polymerase require the looser structure provided by euchromatin.
2. Metaphase: The metaphase structure of chromatin differs vastly to that of interphase. It is optimised for physical strength and manageability, forming the classic chromosome structure seen in karyotypes. The structure of the condensed chromatin is thought to be loops of 30 nm fibre to a central scaffold of proteins. It is, however, not well-characterised. Chromosome scaffolds play an important role to hold the chromatin into compact chromosomes. Loops of 30 nm structure further condense with scaffold, into higher order structures. Chromosome scaffolds are made of proteins including condensin, type IIA topoisomerase and kinesin family member 4 (KIF4). The physical strength of chromatin is vital for this stage of division to prevent shear damage to the DNA as the daughter chromosomes are separated. To maximise strength the composition of the chromatin changes as it approaches the centromere, primarily through alternative histone H1 analogues. During mitosis, although most of the chromatin is tightly compacted, there are small regions that are not as tightly compacted. These regions often correspond to promoter regions of genes that were active in that cell type prior to chromatin formation. The lack of compaction of these regions is called bookmarking, which is an epigenetic mechanism believed to be important for transmitting to daughter cells the "memory" of which genes were active prior to entry into mitosis. This bookmarking mechanism is needed to help transmit this memory because transcription ceases during mitosis.

== Specialized chromatin states ==
=== Sperm chromatin ===
During metazoan spermiogenesis, the spermatid's chromatin is remodeled into a more spaced-packaged, widened, almost crystal-like structure. This process is associated with the cessation of transcription and involves nuclear protein exchange. The histones are mostly displaced, and replaced by protamines (small, arginine-rich proteins). It is proposed that in yeast, regions devoid of histones become very fragile after transcription; HMO1, an HMG-box protein, helps in stabilizing nucleosomes-free chromatin.

== Chromatin and DNA repair ==
A variety of internal and external agents can cause DNA damage in cells. Many factors influence how the repair route is selected, including the cell cycle phase and chromatin segment where the break occurred. In terms of initiating 5' end DNA repair, the p53 binding protein 1 (53BP1) and BRCA1 are important protein components that influence double-strand break repair pathway selection. The 53BP1 complex attaches to chromatin near DNA breaks and activates downstream factors such as Rap1-Interacting Factor 1 (RIF1) and shieldin, which protects DNA ends against nucleolytic destruction. DNA damage process occurs within the condition of chromatin, and the constantly changing chromatin environment has a large effect on it. Accessing and repairing the damaged cell of DNA, the genome condenses into chromatin and repairing it through modifying the histone residues. Through altering the chromatin structure, histones residues are adding chemical groups namely phosphate, acetyl and one or more methyl groups and these control the expressions of gene building by proteins to acquire DNA. Moreover, resynthesis of the delighted zone, DNA will be repaired by processing and restructuring the damaged bases. In order to maintain genomic integrity, "homologous recombination and classical non-homologous end joining process" has been followed by DNA to be repaired.

The packaging of eukaryotic DNA into chromatin presents a barrier to all DNA-based processes that require recruitment of enzymes to their sites of action. To allow the critical cellular process of DNA repair, the chromatin must be remodeled. In eukaryotes, ATP-dependent chromatin remodeling complexes and histone-modifying enzymes are two predominant factors employed to accomplish this remodeling process.

Chromatin relaxation occurs rapidly at the site of DNA damage. This process is initiated by PARP1 protein that starts to appear at DNA damage in less than a second, with half maximum accumulation within 1.6 seconds after the damage occurs. Next the chromatin remodeler Alc1 quickly attaches to the product of PARP1, and completes arrival at the DNA damage within 10 seconds of the damage. About half of the maximum chromatin relaxation, presumably due to action of Alc1, occurs by 10 seconds. This then allows recruitment of the DNA repair enzyme MRE11, to initiate DNA repair, within 13 seconds.

γH2AX, the phosphorylated form of H2AX is also involved in the early steps leading to chromatin decondensation after DNA damage occurrence. The histone variant H2AX constitutes about 10% of the H2A histones in human chromatin. γH2AX (H2AX phosphorylated on serine 139) can be detected as soon as 20 seconds after irradiation of cells (with DNA double-strand break formation), and half maximum accumulation of γH2AX occurs in one minute. The extent of chromatin with phosphorylated γH2AX is about two million base pairs at the site of a DNA double-strand break. γH2AX does not, itself, cause chromatin decondensation, but within 30 seconds of irradiation, RNF8 protein can be detected in association with γH2AX. RNF8 mediates extensive chromatin decondensation, through its subsequent interaction with CHD4, a component of the nucleosome remodeling and deacetylase complex NuRD.

After undergoing relaxation subsequent to DNA damage, followed by DNA repair, chromatin recovers to a compaction state close to its pre-damage level after about 20 min.

== Methods to study chromatin ==
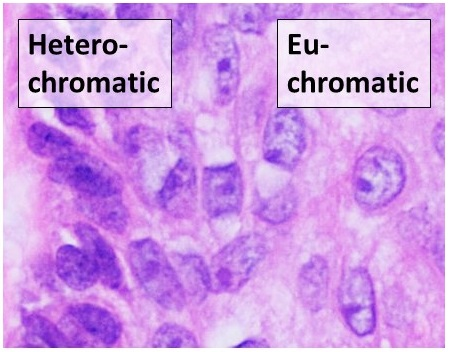
Microscopy of heterochromatic versus euchromatic nuclei (H&E stain).

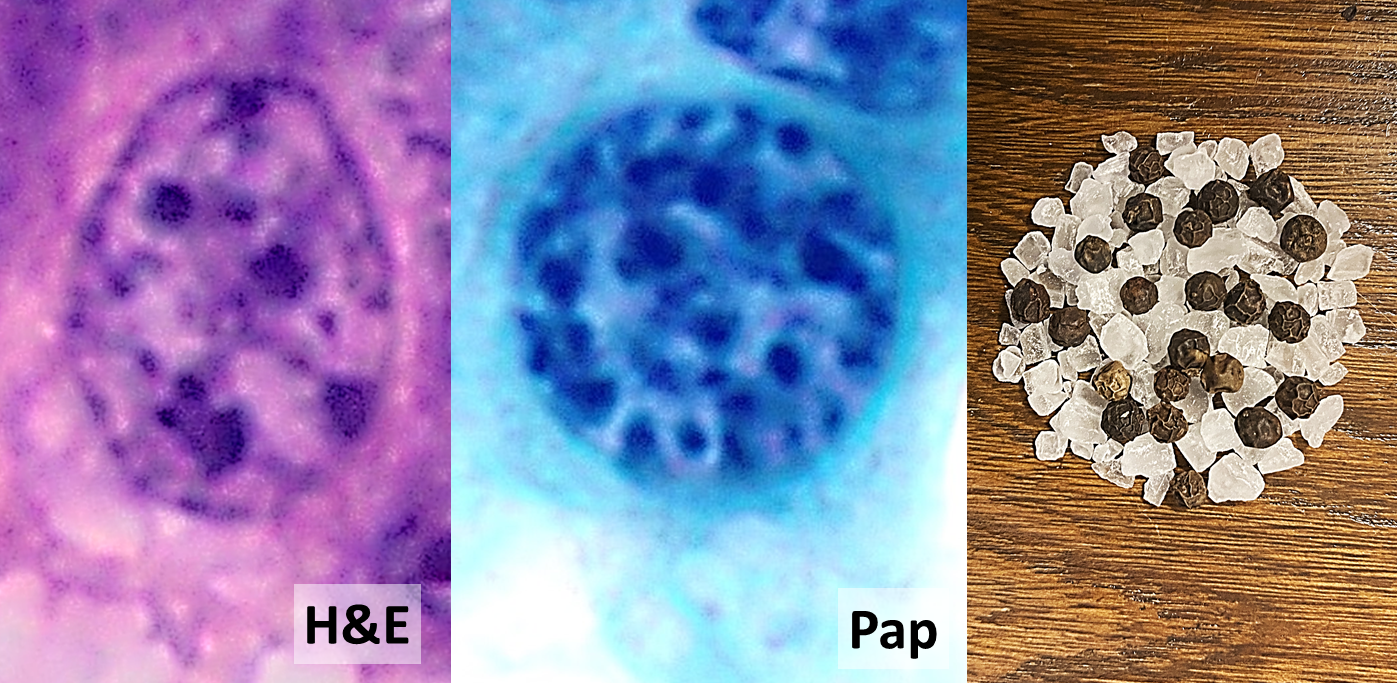
Granular "salt-and-pepper chromatin", seen on H&E, Pap stain and comparison to actual salt and pepper. Its finding on microscopy indicates mainly medullary thyroid carcinoma, neuroendocrine tumours or pheochromocytoma.

Schematic karyogram of a human, showing an overview of the human genome using G banding, which is a method that includes Giemsa staining, wherein the lighter staining regions are generally more euchromatic (and more transcriptionally active), whereas darker regions generally are more heterochromatic.

1. ChIP-seq (Chromatin immunoprecipitation sequencing) is recognized as the vastly utilized chromatin identification method it has been using the antibodies that actively select, identify and combine with proteins including "histones, histone restructuring, transcription factors and cofactors". This has been providing data about the state of chromatin and the transcription of a gene by trimming "oligonucleotides" that are unbound. Chromatin immunoprecipitation sequencing aimed against different histone modifications, can be used to identify chromatin states throughout the genome. Different modifications have been linked to various states of chromatin.
2. DNase-seq (DNase I hypersensitive sites Sequencing) uses the sensitivity of accessible regions in the genome to the DNase I enzyme to map open or accessible regions in the genome.
3. FAIRE-seq (Formaldehyde-Assisted Isolation of Regulatory Elements sequencing) uses the chemical properties of protein-bound DNA in a two-phase separation method to extract nucleosome depleted regions from the genome.
4. ATAC-seq (Assay for Transposable Accessible Chromatin sequencing) uses the Tn5 transposase to integrate (synthetic) transposons into accessible regions of the genome consequentially highlighting the localisation of nucleosomes and transcription factors across the genome.
5. DNA footprinting is a method aimed at identifying protein-bound DNA. It uses labeling and fragmentation coupled to gel electrophoresis to identify areas of the genome that have been bound by proteins.
6. MNase-seq (Micrococcal Nuclease sequencing) uses the micrococcal nuclease enzyme to identify nucleosome positioning throughout the genome.
7. Chromosome conformation capture determines the spatial organization of chromatin in the nucleus, by inferring genomic locations that physically interact.
8. MACC profiling (Micrococcal nuclease ACCessibility profiling) uses titration series of chromatin digests with micrococcal nuclease to identify chromatin accessibility as well as to map nucleosomes and non-histone DNA-binding proteins in both open and closed regions of the genome.

== Physical and topological properties ==
=== Chromatin knots ===
It has been a puzzle how decondensed interphase chromosomes remain essentially unknotted. The natural expectation is that in the presence of type II DNA topoisomerases that permit passages of double-stranded DNA regions through each other, all chromosomes should reach the state of topological equilibrium. The topological equilibrium in highly crowded interphase chromosomes forming chromosome territories would result in formation of highly knotted chromatin fibres. However, Chromosome Conformation Capture (3C) methods revealed that the decay of contacts with the genomic distance in interphase chromosomes is practically the same as in the crumpled globule state that is formed when long polymers condense without formation of any knots. To remove knots from highly crowded chromatin, one would need an active process that should not only provide the energy to move the system from the state of topological equilibrium but also guide topoisomerase-mediated passages in such a way that knots would be efficiently unknotted instead of making the knots even more complex. It has been shown that the process of chromatin-loop extrusion is ideally suited to actively unknot chromatin fibres in interphase chromosomes.

== See also ==
- Active chromatin sequence
- Chromatid
- Chromosome
- ENCODE database
- Epigenetics
- Histone-modifying enzymes
- Position-effect variegation
- Transcriptional bursting
