= Epigenetics of physical exercise =

Field of study

Epigenetics of physical exercise is the study of epigenetic modifications to the cell genome resulting from physical exercise. Environmental factors, including physical exercise, have been shown to have a beneficial influence on epigenetic modifications. Generally, it has been shown that acute and long-term exercise has a significant effect on DNA methylation, an important aspect of epigenetic modifications.

The broader field of epigenetics studies heritable alterations to genes that do not involve changing the DNA sequence itself. The next section briefly discusses two important mechanisms involved in epigenetic modifications.

== Epigenetic modifications ==
Epigenetic modifications such as DNA methylation and histone modifications alter DNA accessibility and change chromatin structure, thereby regulating patterns of gene expression. These modifications can be heritable, thus passing from parent to offspring.

As mentioned previously, environmental factors can modulate epigenetic alterations. Factors such as diet, exposure to environmental toxins, and stress have all been shown to play a role in affecting epigenetic modifications, especially by influencing methylation patterns in the DNA. Physical exercise is one such factor that also has been shown to affect methylation and chromatin modifications.

=== DNA Methylation ===
DNA methylation occurs when a methyl group is covalently attached to the C5 position of a cytosine nucleotide by a DNA methyltransferase (DNMT) enzyme. These dinucleotide repeats where cytosine is followed by an adjunct guanine nucleotide are referred to as CpG sites, with the 'p' indicating a phosphodiester linkage. Parts of the genome that contain a high amount of CpG sites are named CpG islands, and these islands often overlap with many of the core promoter regions found in the human genome. There are also CpG sites that are not a part of CpG islands, and these are constitutively methylated to indicate to transcription machinery to not allow transcription to be initiated there. In contrast, CpG islands are the areas in the genome where CpG sites are usually unmethylated until DNMTs methylate them, resulting in effects on gene expression.

The methylation of CpG islands typically results in the transcriptional silencing of a promoter, which can be done in two ways. Methylation can recruit histone deacetylases (HDAC), which work to form tightly condensed heterochromatin, which is transcriptionally inactive. Methylating a CpG island will also cause the methyl group to wedge into the DNA major groove, effectively blocking binding sites for proteins that can activate transcription.

=== Post-translational histone modifications ===
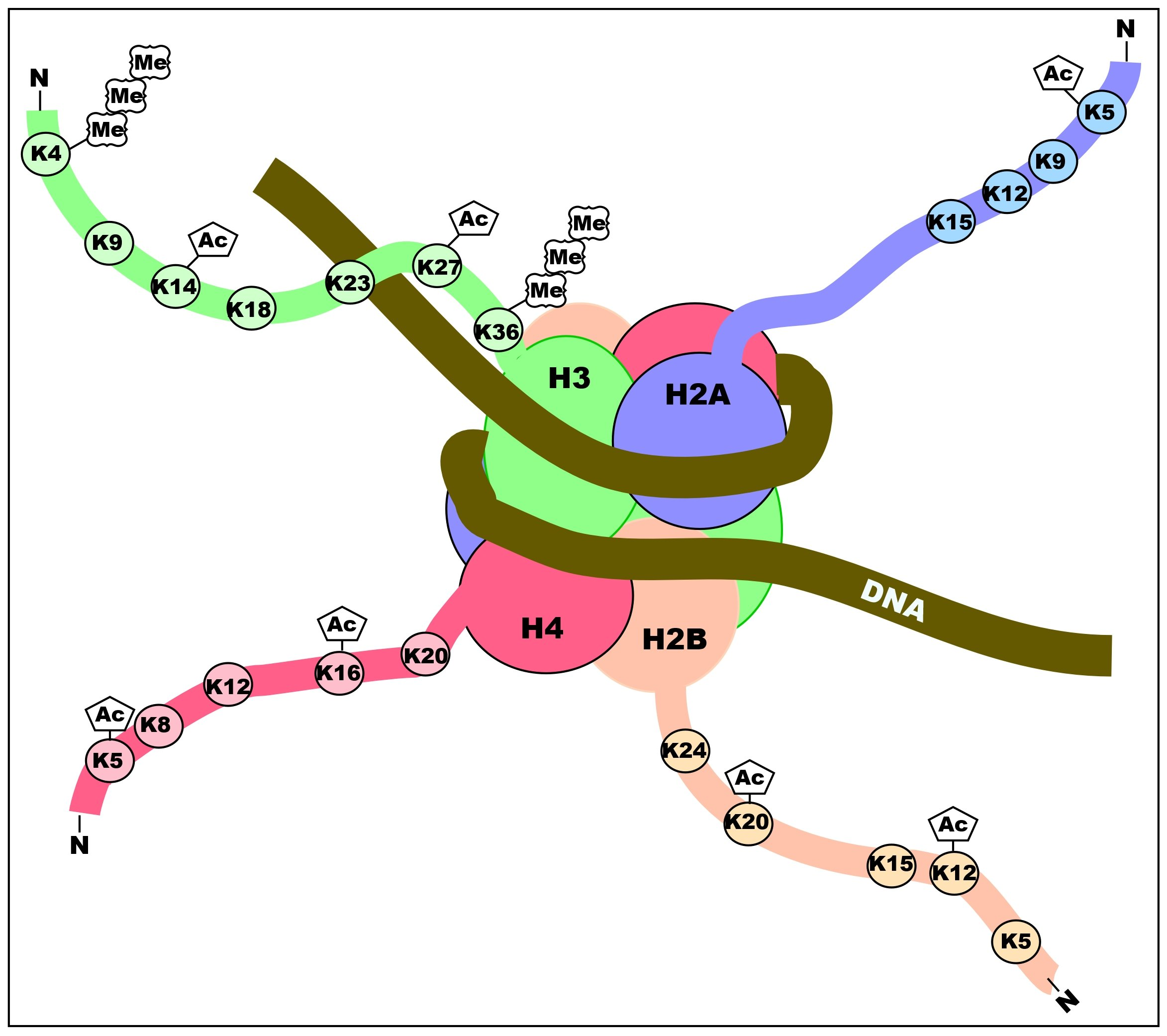
Some acetylations and some methylations of lysines (symbol K) are activation signals for transcription when present on a nucleosome, as shown in the top figure. Some methylations on lysines or arginine (R) are repression signals for transcription when present on a nucleosome, as shown in the bottom figure. Nucleosomes consist of four pairs of histone proteins in a tightly assembled core region plus up to 30% of each histone remaining in a loosely organized tail (only one tail of each pair is shown). DNA is wrapped around the histone core proteins in chromatin. The lysines (K) are designated with a number showing their position as, for instance (K4), indicating lysine as the 4th amino acid from the amino (N) end of the tail in the histone protein. Methylations [Me], and acetylations [Ac] are common post-translational modifications on the lysines of the histone tails.

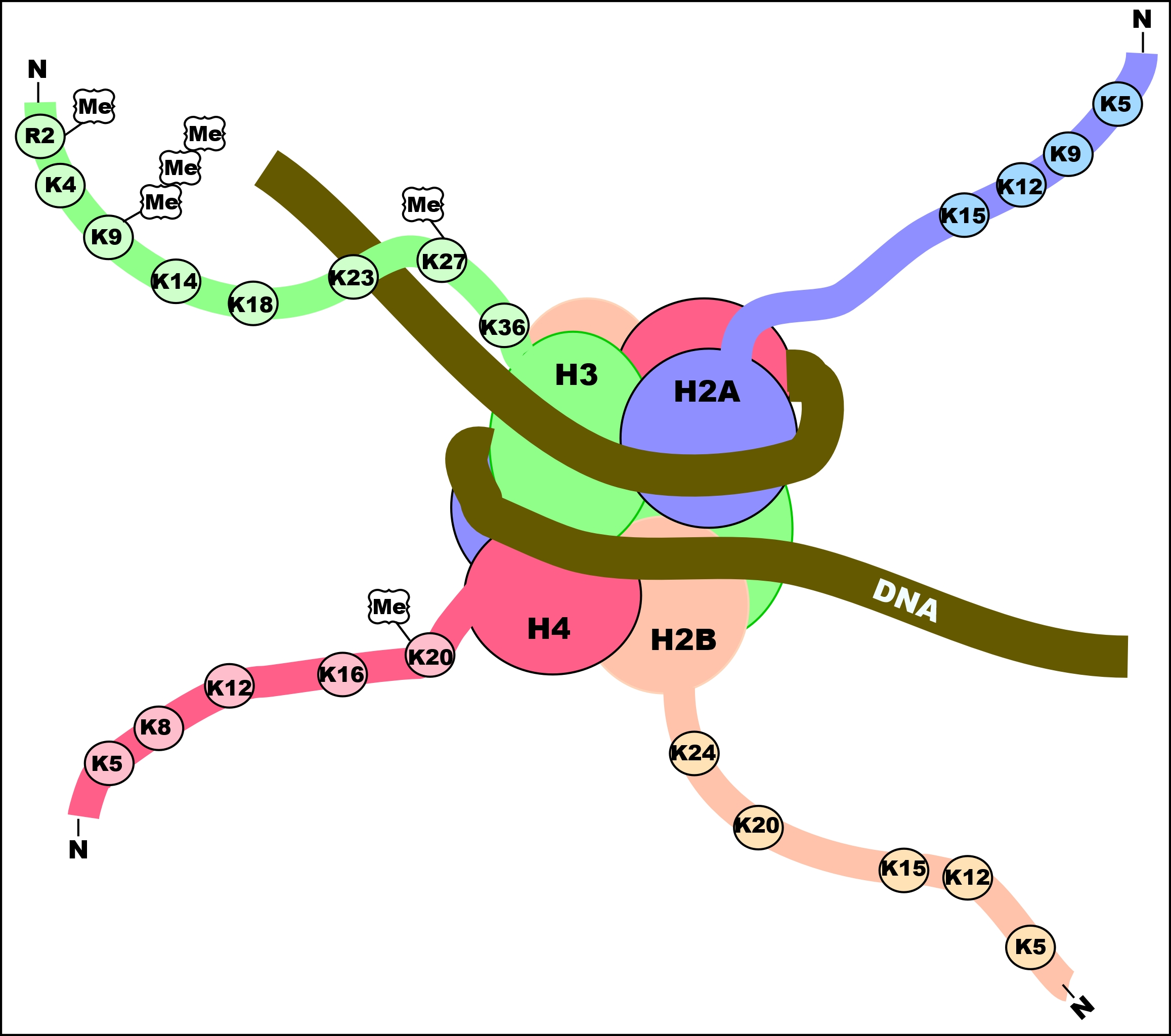

Histones are proteins that help organize DNA. Eight histone proteins assemble into an octomer that DNA wraps around to create a unit called a nucleosome. The ability of a histone to be modified by being marked on its N-terminal tail is essential for modulating gene expression. In its most basic sense, histones can be modified to become more or less condensed by histone deacetylases (HDACs) or histone acetyltransferases (HATs), respectively. When histones are acetylated and become less condensed as a result, it allows for the underlying DNA to be more accessible to be transcribed, increasing gene expression. Thus, acetylated histones can serve as binding sites for important transcription initiation factors and enzymes that have the ability to remodel chromatin. Meanwhile, increased condensation of histones via deacetylation results in the opposite effect, causing decreased gene expression. The regulation of gene expression can have implications on which genes are transcribed, ultimately affecting protein production in the human body.

Though histone tails can be marked in many different ways, four prominent modifications will be discussed in this article: acetylation, methylation (of histones), ubiquination, and phosphorylation.

In addition, methylated histones can both serve as binding sites for certain transcription factors due to their bromodomains and chromodomains, and also prevent the binding of such factors by hiding the recognition site of the transcription factor. Transcription factors, including promoters and enhancers, can subsequently modulate the rate at which DNA is transcribed to RNA, also affecting gene expression.

== Muscle and endocrine effects due to physical exercise ==
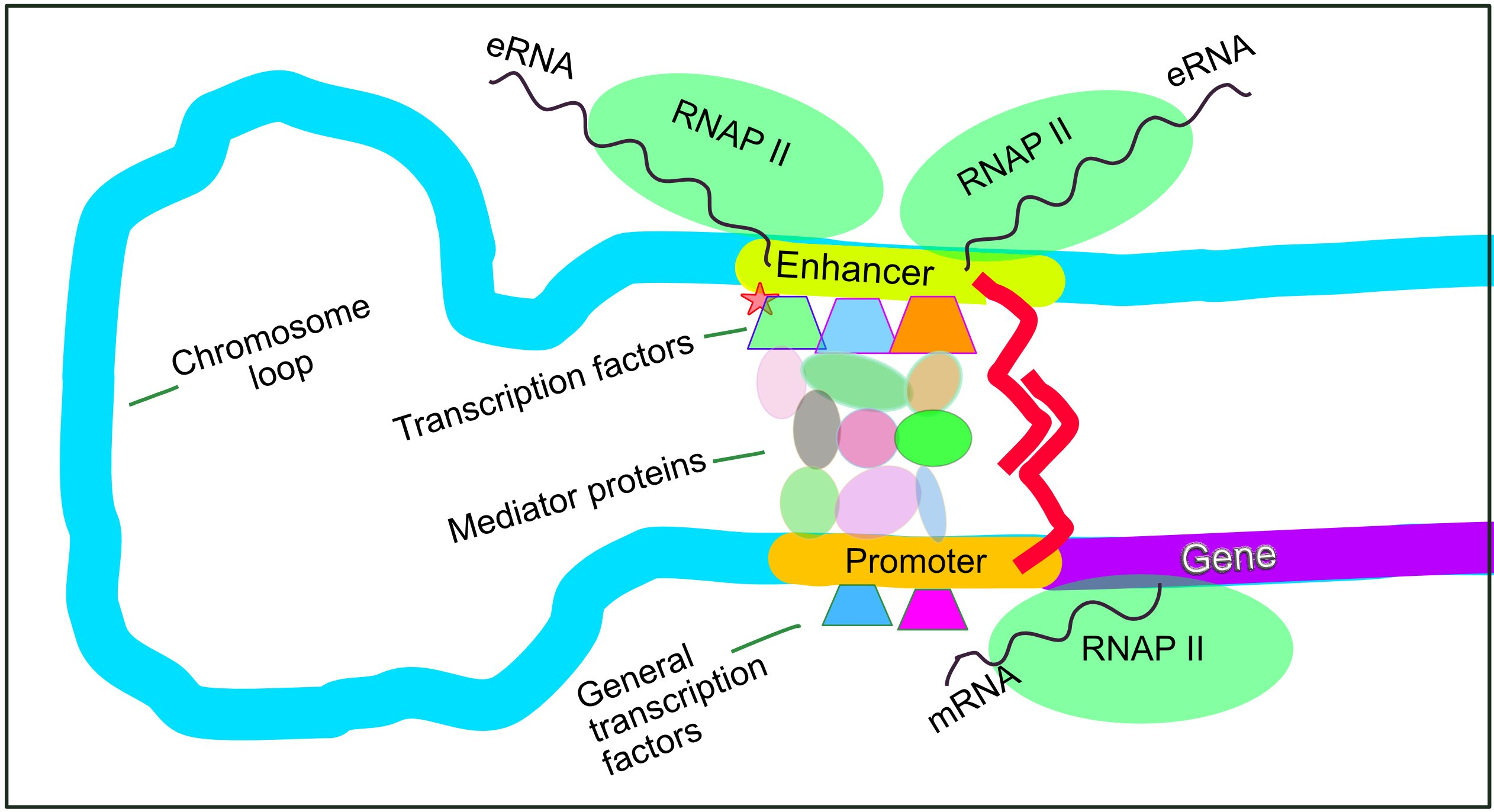
Regulation of transcription in mammals. An active enhancer regulatory sequence of DNA is enabled to interact with the promoter DNA regulatory sequence of its target gene by formation of a chromosome loop.

Exercise of the human vastus lateralis (a thigh muscle) primarily affects the epigentic status of sites in enhancers within muscle cell chromatin, as described in detail below. In contrast, exercise of this skeletal muscle causes few or no epigenetic alterations in promoters or within genes of muscle cell chromatin.

Skeletal muscles are substantially composed of very large, multinucleated, contractile muscle fiber cells (myocytes). However, considerable numbers of small resident and infiltrating mononuclear cells are also present in skeletal muscles. In terms of volume, myocytes make up the great majority of skeletal muscle. However, in terms of nuclei present in skeletal muscle, myocyte nuclei may be only half of the nuclei present, while nuclei from resident and infiltrating mononuclear cells make up the other half.

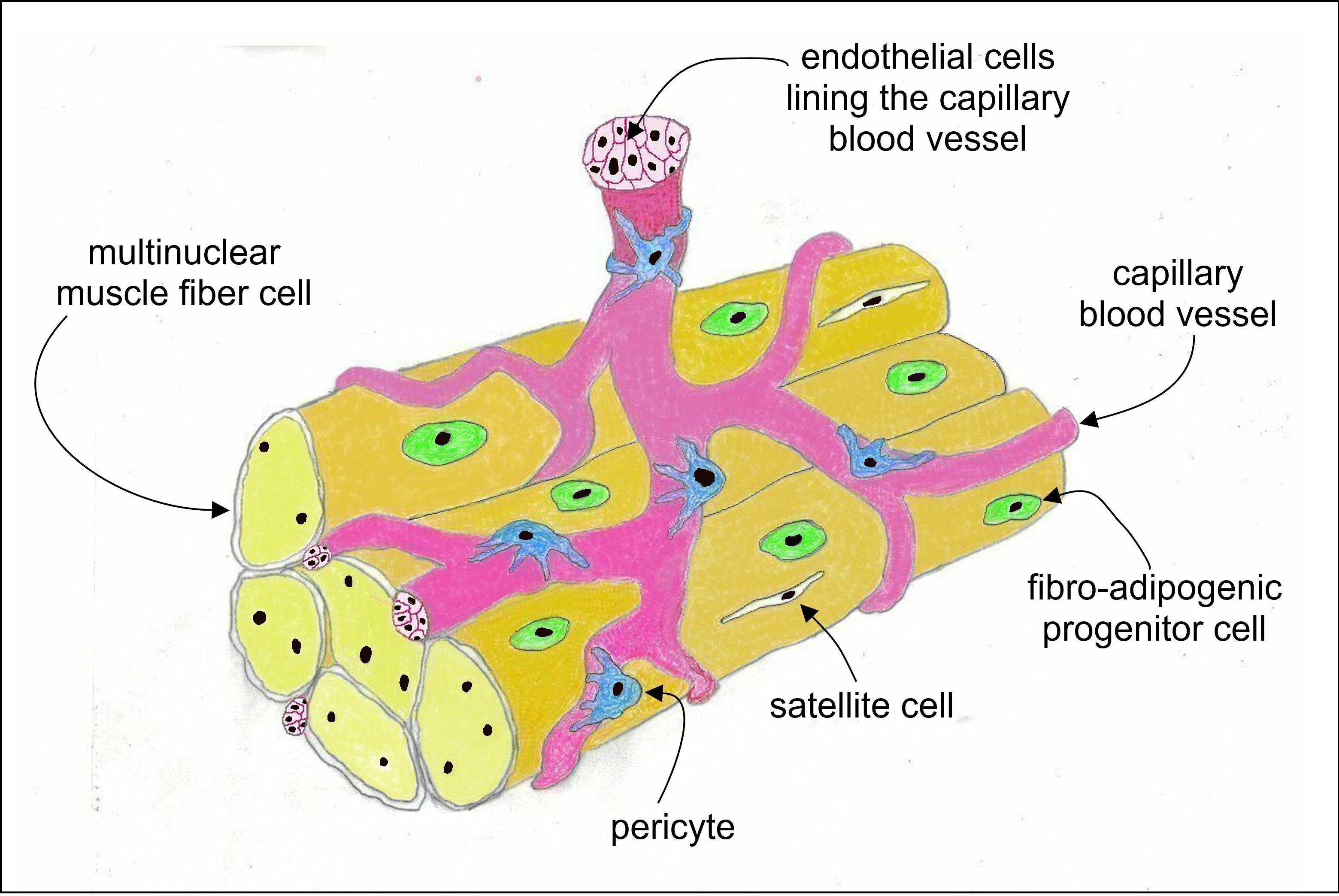
Skeletal muscle cell types include: very large multinuclear muscle fiber cells; small endothelial cells that line the inside of capillary blood vessels; small fibro-adipogenic progenitor cells (FAPs) which are muscle-fiber-adjacent multipotent mesenchymal stem cells that under different conditions can differentiate into adipocytes, fibroblasts or osteocytes. Also shown are pericytes situated on the outer surface of blood capillaries where they interact with the underlying endothelial cells. In addition, satellite cells are shown that can fuse with muscle fibers and contribute new myonuclei to muscle fibers, grow into new myocytes, or support focal membrane damage repair.

== Mononuclear cells of skeletal muscle ==
Mononuclear cells found in skeletal muscle tissue samples from mice and humans can be identified by messenger RNA transcription of cell type markers. Cameron et al. identified nine cell types in skeletal muscles. They include endothelial cells (45% of cells), fibro-adipogenic progenitors (FAPs)(20%), pericytes (14%) and endothelial-like pericytes (4%). Another 9% of mononuclear cells are muscle stem cells, adjacent to muscle fiber cells. Types of lymphoid cells (such as B-cells and T-cells) (3%) and myeloid cells such as macrophages (2%) make up most of the remaining mononuclear cells of skeletal muscle. In addition, Cameron et al. also identified two types of myocyte cells, Type I and Type II. Each of the different types of cells in skeletal muscle was found to express different sets of genes. The median number of genes expressed in each of the nine different cell types was 1,331 genes. When a biopsy is taken from a thigh muscle, however, the biopsy contains all the different cell types. Mixed together, in a biopsy of human thigh skeletal muscle, there are 13,026 to 13,108 genes with detected expression.

The functions of skeletal muscle include producing movement, maintaining body posture, controlling body temperature, and stabilizing joints. Skeletal muscle is also an endocrine organ. Under different physiological conditions, subsets of 654 different proteins as well as lipids, amino acids, metabolites and small RNAs are found in the secretome of skeletal muscles. A secretome is secreted by skeletal muscle cells, either locally (in skeletal muscle interstitium) or into the blood circulation, with a measurable plasma concentration. Secreted proteins often have an endocrine effect.

=== Skeletal muscle secretome alters with exercise ===
Williams et al. obtained biopsies of a thigh skeletal muscle (vastus lateralis muscle) of eight 23-year-old, originally sedentary, Caucasian males. Biopsies were taken both before and after a six-week-long endurance exercise training program. The exercise consisted of riding a stationary bicycle for one hour five days a week for six weeks.

Of the 13,108 genes with detected expression in the muscle biopsies, 641 genes were upregulated after endurance training and 176 genes were downregulated. Of the 817 genes whose expression was altered, 531 were identified as being in the secretome of skeletal muscle. Because many of the exercise-regulated genes are identified as secreted, this indicates that much of the effect of exercise has an endocrine rather than metabolic function. The main pathways found to be affected by secreted exercise-regulated proteins were related to cardiac, cognitive, kidney and platelet functions.

=== Exercise-trained effects are mediated by epigenetic mechanisms ===
Between 2012 and 2019 at least 25 reports indicated a major role of epigenetic mechanisms in skeletal muscle responses to exercise. Epigenetic alterations often occur by adding methyl groups to cytosines in the DNA or removing methyl groups from the cytosines of DNA, especially at CpG sites within enhancers. Methylations of cytosines can cause the DNA to be compacted into heterochromatin, thus inhibiting access of other molecules to the DNA. Epigenetic alterations also often occur through acetylations or deacetylations of the histone tails within chromatin. DNA in the nucleus generally consists of segments of 146 base pairs of DNA wrapped around eight tightly connected histones (and each histone also has a loose tail) in a structure called a nucleosome and one segment of DNA is connected to an adjacent DNA segment on a nucleosome by linker DNA. When histone tails are acetylated they usually cause loosening of the DNA around the nucleosome, leading to increased accessibility of the DNA.

=== Exercise-induced regulation of genes in muscles ===
Gene expression in muscle is largely regulated, as in tissues generally, by regulatory DNA sequences, especially enhancers. Enhancers are non-coding sequences in the genome that activate the expression of distant target genes, by looping around and interacting with the promoters of their target genes (see Figure "Regulation of transcription in mammals"). As reported by Williams et al., the average distance in the loop between the connected enhancers and promoters of muscle genes is 239,000 nucleotide bases.

=== Exercise-induced alteration to gene expression by enhancer DNA methylation or demethylation ===
Endurance muscle training alters muscle gene expression by epigenetic DNA methylation or de-methylation of CpG sites within enhancers.

In a study by Lindholm et al., twenty-three individuals who were about 27 years old and sedentary volunteered to have endurance training on only one leg during 3 months. The other leg was used as an untrained control leg. The training consisted of one-legged knee extension training for 3 month (45 min, 4 sessions per week). Skeletal muscle biopsies from the vastus lateralis (a thigh muscle) were taken both before training began and 24 hours after the last training session from each of the legs. The endurance-trained leg, compared to the untrained leg, had significant DNA methylation changes at 4,919 sites across the genome. The sites of altered DNA methylation were predominantly in enhancers. Transcriptional analysis, using RNA sequencing, identified 4,076 differentially expressed genes.

The transcriptionally upregulated genes were associated with enhancers that had a significant decrease in DNA methylation, while transcriptionally downregulated genes were associated with enhancers that had increased DNA methylation. Increased methylation was mainly associated with genes involved in structural remodeling of the muscle and glucose metabolism. Enhancers with decreased methylation were associated with genes functioning in inflammatory or immunological processes and in transcriptional regulation.

=== Exercise-induced long-term alteration of gene expression by enhancer histone acetylation or deacetylation ===
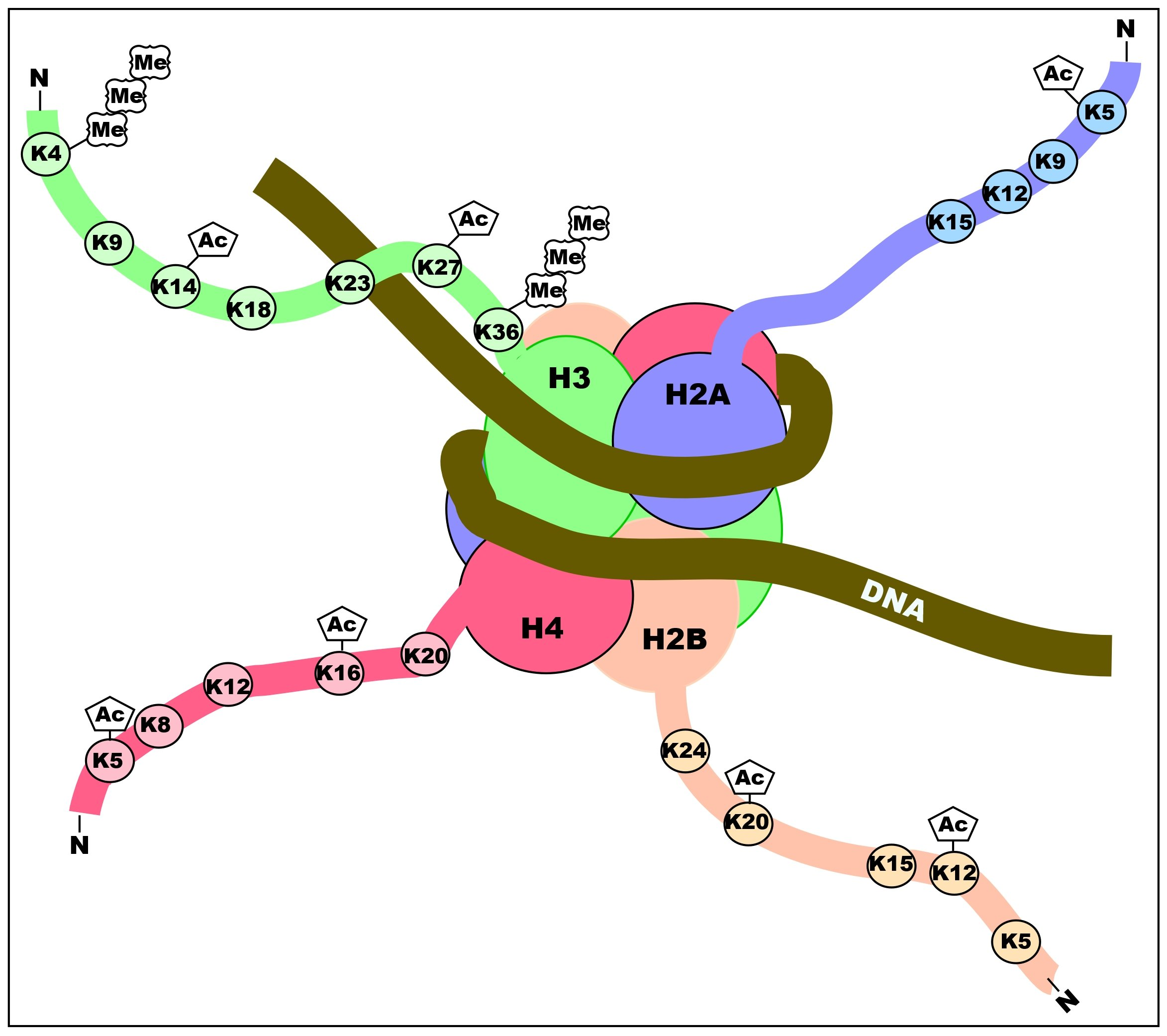
A nucleosome with histone tails set for transcriptional activation

As indicated above, after exercise, epigenetic alterations of enhancers alter long-term expression of hundreds of muscle genes. This includes genes producing proteins secreted into the systemic circulation, many of which may act as endocrine messengers. Six sedentary, about 23 years old, Caucasian males provided vastus lateralis (a thigh muscle) biopsies before entering an exercise program (six weeks of 60-minute sessions of riding a stationary cycle, five days per week). Four days after this exercise program was completed, the expression of many genes was persistently epigenetically altered. The alterations included acetylations and deacetylations of the histone tails located in the enhancers controlling the genes with altered expression.

Up-regulated genes were associated with epigenetic acetylations of histone 3 lysine 27 (H3K27ac) of nucleosomes located at their enhancers. Down-regulated genes were associated with the removal of epigenetic acetylations at H3K27 in nucleosomes located at their enhancers (see Figure "A nucleosome with histone tails set for transcriptional activation"). Biopsies of the vastus lateralis muscle showed expression of 13,108 genes at baseline before the exercise training program. Four days after the exercise program was completed, biopsies of the same muscles showed altered gene expression, with 641 genes up-regulated and 176 genes down-regulated. Williams et al. identified 599 enhancer-gene interactions, covering 491 enhancers and 268 genes (multiple enhancers were found connected to some genes), where both the enhancer and the connected target gene were coordinately either upregulated or downregulated after exercise training.

== Effects on cancer ==
Physical exercise leads to epigenetic modifications that can have beneficial effects in cancer patients. The effect of physical exercise on DNA methylation patterns leads to increased expression of genes associated with tumor suppression and decreased expression of oncogenes. Cancer cells have non-normal patterns of DNA methylation including hypermethylation in promoter regions for tumor-suppressing genes and hypomethylation in promoter regions of oncogenes. These epigenetic mutations in cancer cells cause the cell to grow and divide uncontrollably, resulting in tumorigenesis. Physical exercise has been shown to reduce and even reverse these epigenetic mutations, increasing expression levels of tumor-suppressing genes and decreasing expression levels of oncogenes.

Hypermethylation in the promoter regions of tumor suppressor genes is thought to help cause some forms of cancer. The hypermethylation in the promoter regions of the tumor suppressing genes APC and RASSF1A are common epigenetic markers for cancer. The APC gene functions to make sure cells divide properly and maintain a correct number of chromosomes after division has completed. The RASSF1A gene product interacts with the DNA repair protein XPA. Physical exercise has been shown to decrease and even reverse these promoter hypermethylation, lowering the risk of the development of cancer. Decreased hypermethylation patterns reveal a transcriptionally accessible promoter region, allowing for increased expression of the tumor suppressing genes.

Physical exercise increases levels of eustress, or good stress, on the body. This eustress stimulates epigenetic modifications affecting the DNA genome of cancer cells. Environmental conditions, such as eustress, strongly induces expression of the tumor suppressor TP53 gene by influencing epigenetic modifications to be made to the cancer cells genome. The TP53 gene codes for the p53 protein, a protein important in the apoptotic pathway of programmed cell death. The p53 protein is important for the regulation of cell growth and apoptosis, so hypermethylation of the TP53 promoter region are common markers associated with the development of cancer. Other than methylation patterns affecting expression of TP53, microRNAs and antisense RNAs control the levels of the p53 protein by regulating expression of the p53 coding TP53 gene.

=== Breast cancer ===
In a study on the epigenetic effects of physical exercise on breast cancer in women, blood samples from breast cancer patients were collected before and after 6 months of moderate-intensity aerobic exercise. The test group experienced 129 minutes of exercise on average per week compared to the control group's 21.8 minutes a week. The study found 43 genes having significant changes in DNA methylation. Of the 43 genes, 3 of the genes experiencing reduced methylation levels were directly correlated with increased survival of breast cancer. The gene L3MBTL1, a known tumor suppressor, had methylation levels decreased by 1.48% in the exercise group while the limited exercise control group experienced a 2.15% increase in methylation. The 1.48% decrease in methylation of L3MBTL1 resulted in greater expression of the tumor suppressor while the 2.15% increase in methylation experienced by the limited exercise control group led to a decrease in expression. The findings of the study showed patients who exercised regularly had lower methylation levels and higher gene expression of L3MBTL1. These patients also experienced a greater than 60% reduction in risk of breast cancer death compared to patients in the limited exercise group.

== Effects on aging ==
=== DNA methylation ===
Epigenetic mechanisms affected by physical exercise have also been seen to be involved in age-related processes. A major component of aging is significant loss of DNA methylation over time. Methyl deoxycytidine, which is a methylated cytosine on the 5' carbon of a cytosine, is involved in the process of cell differentiation and maintenance. Cell differentiation involves methylation of different areas within the DNA of a cell, which can alter the transcription of genes. During cell differentiation, DNA methylation is important for establishing the identity and function of a cell because of its role in controlling gene expression. A recent study looking at genome DNA methylation of newborn infants and humans aged 100 years or older found that the older individuals had significantly decreased overall DNA methylation. As one ages, the amount of DNA methylation slowly begins to decrease.

Studies have also looked at methyl deoxycytidine residues from tissues collected from rodents at various ages. These studies found that DNA methylation loss increased significantly as the rodent aged. Thus, aging is related to a significant loss in DNA methylation. However, this loss of DNA methylation appears to be slowed by physical exercise under rare conditions, in general this effect is not very well studied and so far it seems like there is no connection between DNA methylation and physical activity. Further studies have looked at the effects of physical exercise on DNA methylation and aging in humans.

Another component of aging is the gradual shortening of telomeres located at the end of chromosomes. Telomeres are repetitive sequences located at the end of chromosomes whose purpose are to slow the process of shortening and cell damage which occurs after every cell division as well as stabilize the ends of DNA. Aging and age-related diseases are associated with the significant shortening of these sequences. The shrinking of telomeres occurs in somatic cells where telomerase, the enzyme in control of telomere lengthening, is not expressed.

However, it has been seen that telomeres can transcribe non-coding RNA, or functional RNAs that do not get translated into protein. Research has demonstrated that some of the non-coding RNAs transcribed at telomeres are involved in heterochromatin formation and stability of the telomeres. These non-coding RNAs can be positively impacted by physical exercise. Notably, a study found that mice exposed to short-term running phases had increased non-coding RNA transcription at telomeres as compared to sedentary controls. This increase in non-coding RNA transcription aided telomere stability, making the exercise group's telomeres less likely to be as affected by aging over time. Through helping to increase telomere stability, physical exercise can have positive impacts on aging by helping to decreasing the shortening of telomeres.

== Effects on metabolic processes ==
In addition to restructuring the muscular and skeletal system to better handle mechanical stress, physical exercise also affects gene expression with respect to metabolism. The effects are widespread and can affect anything from muscle growth to aerobic stamina to diabetes and other metabolic disorders.

In general, even a small amount of exercise can induce hypomethylation of the whole genome within muscle cells. This means that many regulatory genes can be turned on for pathways like muscle repair and growth. The intensity of the exercise directly correlates to the amount of promoter demethylation, so more strenuous exercise activates more genes.

MicroRNAs (miRNAs) interfere with mRNA that is present and render it unusable and therefore decrease the product of that mRNA. MiRNAs regulate many physiological processes, such as inflammation, angiogenesis (the creation of blood vessels), as well as ischemia (the restriction of blood flow within the vessels) prevention. Aerobic exercise reduces the overall number of various miRNAs within the skeletal muscle that produce negative effects. Stimuli that cause the body to enter an anabolic, or constructive, phase, such as resistance training as well as the correct diet, has also shown a reduction of miRNAs. This reduction may actually play a role in the growth of the muscle cell.

Class IIa Histone deacetyltransferases (HDACs) are highly expressed within human skeletal muscles. Exercise helps to reduce their activity, especially at promoters, which affects gene expression. In mice, this regulation of HDAC5 has been shown to increase the amount of type I fibers in muscle. Type I fibers are slow twitch, endurance fibers. This data agrees with human data that says the amount of type I fibers is positively correlated with the maximal aerobic capacity.

It also suggested that the amount of type 1 fibers is correlated with a histone acetyltransferase (HAT) that is involved in osteoblast differentiation and bone formation.

=== Diabetes ===
Individuals with type II diabetes have hypermethylation of several genes within the muscle, like peroxisome proliferator-activated receptor gamma (PPAR-γ) and coactivator 1 alpha (PGC-1α). The hypermethylation of these genes decreases the expression of both mitochondrial DNA as well as PGC-1α mRNA. Exercise is a way to prevent and treat these effects by helping to hypomethylate PPAR-γ and PGC-1α. Additionally, exercise also increases expression of glucose transporter type 4 (GLUT4), which will also help with diabetes symptoms.

== Effects on cognition ==
Physical exercise can cause various types of epigenetic alterations, but there are four prominent types that affect cognition that will be discussed in this article. The other types of epigenetic alterations cannot be ruled out as not having an effect on cognition, but there is not much known about them yet. An extensive 2017 review describes effects of exercise on the brain due to (1) DNA methylation, (2) histone acetylation, (3) histone methylation, and (4) microRNA expression, and the consequences of these alterations on learning and memory (cognition). Generally, the reviews found that exercise had positive effects on cognition, including enhanced cognitive function and the reversal of cognitive decline that typically happens during aging. Short-term effects of exercise were found to improve several cognitive abilities, such as cognitive flexibility and working memory, as well. The epigenetic mechanisms that act as a bridge between exercise and cognition are discussed below.

=== DNA methylation ===
As summarized in the 2017 review, in rats, exercise enhances the expression of the gene Bdnf, which has an essential role in memory formation. Enhanced expression of Bdnf occurs through demethylation of its CpG island promoter at exon IV. Demethylation is implemented in part through the actions of thymine-DNA glycosylase and the base excision repair system.

Exercise decreases hippocampus expression of the gene-repressive DNA methylating enzymes DNMT1, DNMT3a and DNMT3b. The hippocampus has important functions in memory, spatial navigation and is part of the reward system. Exercise also attenuates the global methylation changes induced by stress.

Exercise has also been found to downregulate protein phosphatase1 (PP1) and calcineurin, both memory-suppressor genes. There is evidence that PP1 increases chromatin condensation through the action of dephosphorylating histone proteins, as well as by suppressing methylation and histone acetylation with the aid of HDACs. Additionally, Tet1, an important gene for memory formation, has been shown to be upregulated in response to two weeks of exercise. Concurrently, exercise also contributed to the demethylation of CpG islands found in the promoter region of gene VegfA, a growth factor that is known to modulate the positive effects that exercise can have towards the brain.

=== Histone H3 acetylation ===
Exercise causes acetylation of histone H3 in the exon IV promoter region of the Bdnf gene essential for memory formation. This acetylation contributes to upregulation of Bdnf in the brain hippocampi of rats. Two weeks of treadmill exercise improves memory performance in an inhibitory avoidance task.

=== Histone H3 methylation ===
Histone methylation can cause transcription repression. Lysine can undergo mono-, di- and tri-methylation. Di- and tri-methylation of histone H3 at lysine 9 (H3K9) is related to transcription repression. Mice deficient in a particular histone-methyltransferase gene, KMT2A (also known as MLL1), in adult excitatory neurons show impairments in hippocampus-dependent memory tasks. Aging induces decreases in the global methylation of H3K9 in the hippocampus. However, physical exercise counteracts the aging induced decreases in the global methylation of H3K9.

=== microRNA ===
MicroRNAs (miRNAs) have been discovered to be potential regulators of numerous biological processes within the brain, ranging from cell proliferation, differentiation, apoptosis, synaptic plasticity and memory formation, all very important processes involved in cognition. These miRNAs have also been found within the hippocampus, amygdala, and cortex, further linking its effects to memory formation and cognition. During their biogenesis, premature-miRNAs are exported from the nucleus to the cytoplasm. Subsequent processing of the pre-miRNA generates mature-miRNA, which binds to 3'UTR "seed sequence" of target mRNAs, a process that is catalyzed by the RNA-induced silencing complex (RISC). The binding of miRNA to the target mRNA can result in degradation of the target mRNA or inhibition of its translation into protein, with the degree of sequence complementarity between the miRNA and mRNA determining which mechanism is employed. Interestingly, each miRNA has the ability to interact with a large number of mRNAs (approximately 200–500 mRNA for each miRNA), suggesting that the majority of the protein-coding genes may be regulated by miRNAs. Therefore, it is not surprising that miRNAs are widely expressed in the brain, and that they can participate in epigenetic mechanisms.

Eukaryotic cells can communicate directly with each other through cell–cell contact or at distance by secreting soluble factors such as hormones, growth factors, cytokines and chemokines. Both RNA and mRNAs can be functionally transferred from a donor to a recipient cell via membrane-derived vesicles called exosomes. Similarly to hormones, miRNAs are released into the circulation (called circulating miRNAs or c-miRNAs), to affect cells throughout the organism. The c-miRNAs are transported by exosomes, high-/low-density lipoproteins, apoptotic bodies, and RNA-binding proteins. A bout of exercise increases c-miR-223 levels in the circulation in young healthy men, while lack of miR-223 leads to hippocampal-dependent memory deficits and neuronal cell death. Likely arising from different mechanisms, both acute exercise and chronic endurance training have been shown to robustly modify the miRNA signature of human plasma.

One pathway that involves miRNA is the CREB (cAMP responsive element binding protein) and BDNF (brain-derived neurotrophic factor) signaling pathway, a well known pathway activated by exercise. MicroRNA-132 (miR-132) is a miRNA that is regulated by CREB and is activated by neuronal activity and BDNF. MiR-132 levels are critical for memory development, with very low or high levels having a detrimental effect, and only moderate levels having a positive effect. It has been described that a single bout of acute intermittent exercise rapidly elevated circulating levels of miR-132 in young healthy men. More recently, it has been shown that conditional knockout of miR-132/212 gene cluster impairs memory and promotes gross alterations in hippocampal transcriptional profile in mice. Overall miR-132 is one of the most studied miRNAs in the context of exercise and is proven to be instrumental in multiple functions in the brain, including neuronal development, synaptic plasticity and memory formation.

MiR-132 is but one of many miRNAs that are regulated by exercise. Microarray analysis shows a total of 32 miRNAs that are differentially expressed in the hypothalamus when subjected to physical activity. In addition, miR-21 and miR-34a have been shown to be regulated by exercise to reduce the harmful effects of brain injury and aging on cognition. Another miRNA, miR-124, known for its role in neurogenesis and memory formation, is also especially important to attenuate the effects of stress and is unregulated by exercise. Finally, physical exercise leads to altered miR clusters affecting increased cardiac angiogenesis in animal models. MiR-1, miR-133a, and miR-206 cluster levels were significantly elevated after exercise and correlated with performance parameters such as maximum oxygen uptake and anaerobic lactate threshold.

Overall, exercise has been shown to alter blood levels of several miRNAs, and this indicates that exercise can use these epigenetic modulators to regulate communication between the brain and peripheral organs. With further knowledge of epigenetic pathways, exercise will continue to show its benefits in all phases of life including but not limited to cancer prevention and treatment, aging, metabolism and metabolic disorders like diabetes and cognition.

== Implications with obesity ==
While it is easy to state that there is an inverse relationship between physical exercise and obesity, the reality—and scientific evidence—suggest otherwise. To start with a definition, obesity is the excess accumulation of fat within adipose tissue and is characterized by a body mass index (BMI) above 30. Obesity correlates with many cardiometabolic comorbidities such as cancer, cardiovascular conditions (stroke, heart failure), and various metabolic diseases. One of the methods of mitigating these effects is reduction of adipose tissue; this can be done by 2 methods—decreasing energy expenditure (physical exercise) or dietary modification.

Research regarding the epigenetic effect of physical exercise on obesity is still in slightly uncharted. Much of the data that is collected simply compares epigenetic changes in patients that have been diagnosed as obese and patients that haven't. However, this cannot discount the role of physical exercise and epigenetics as many of the epigenetic differences are correlated with BMI and waist circumference, both of which can be controlled via physical exercise. With that mentioned, since the research is new, there's a plethora of information, much of which is unreviewed. Overall, the evidence for the effect of obesity on epigenetics lies in a specific set of genes that controls waist circumference(WC) and body mass index(BMI)--the evidence is not more concrete than this.

In a study that combined methylation data from 10,000 blood samples, 187 CpG sites were shown to be associated with BMI. What they found was highly interesting: deviations in DNA methylation in blood are usually assumed to be the result of obesity, and on some occasions, the cause. Using quantitative genetic analysis techniques, the researchers attempted to find either a causative or consequential relationship between the implicated genes and the obesity. They found that most of the interactions between the genes of interest and obesity were consequential—demonstrating that any alteration in gene activity is most likely the result of obesity, not a factor that caused it. This study was verified by testing within adipose tissue.

CD38 (cluster of differentiation 38) is a glycoprotein with enzymatic activity found on the surface of specific immune cells. The ectoenzyme has been shown to be important in nicotinic acid adenine dinucleotide phosphate (NAADP) synthesis. NAADP is an intracellular second messenger implicated in Ca^{2+} release. When knocked-out in mice, the result was an increased metabolic rate and obesity resistance (induced by a high-fat diet). This tells us that CD38 is an important factor in the epigenetic change in regards to obesity. As found in an additional study, MSI2, a gene encoding the Musashi RNA-binding protein 2 was found to be associated with eating behavior. The same study found that LARS2 (mitochondrial gene) was implicated with BMI and waist circumference. In both cases, the researchers noted that for a +1 unit increase in BMI, there was a change in methylation by 0.0009 for both genes and that for every unit increase in WC, there was a change in methylation by 0.0004. According to another story, MSI2 methylation can be a predictor of BMI, accounting 24% of variance.

Lastly, in a study conducted in 2018, the gene SOCS3, a cytokine signaling suppressor, was found to be upregulated in obesity and was shown to induce leptin and insulin resistance. The paper states "increased SOCS3 expression in obese individuals is associated with several metabolic disorders, including reduced energy expenditure, increased food intake and adiposity, and insulin and leptin resistance. In addition, recent studies found that SOCS3 expression regulates energy and glucose homeostasis in several metabolic conditions, such as pregnancy, caloric restriction, and refeeding".

To conclude, it cannot be said that physical exercise itself is causing epigenetic changes to reverse obesity. However, it's been made clear that physical exercise is implicated in certain factors (BMI, metabolic rate, waist circumference) that are the parameters for diagnosing obesity. These parameters themselves are shown to be correlated with epigenetic changes, whether causative or as a symptom.

== Effects on neurodegenerative diseases ==
An increasing amount of evidence shows that physical exercise is also involved in the potential treatment and prevention of neurodegenerative diseases. A key assessment thus far is that physical exercise is a key factor for increasing hippocampal adult neurogenesis. Physical exercise has also shown to reduce the excessive neuroinflammation generally regarded as the root cause of many neurodegenerative disorders.

=== Epilepsy ===
Studies have found that physical exercise is a viable, non-pharmaceutical approach to resisting and even undoing the harmful processes that cause sudden abnormal changes in brain cell activity resulting in seizures that characterize epilepsy. One area of focus looks to the effect on brain-derived neurotrophic factor (BDNF) levels following a seizure event. Proper regulation of BDNF levels is necessary to maintain the BDNF-TrkB signaling pathway responsible for healthy synaptic plasticity. It has been observed that seizure events are consistently followed by a significant increase then drastic drop in BDNF levels which results in reduced cognition and further increases the probability of seizure events in the future. However, animal models have shown that epileptic patients undergoing physical exercise, especially if it's routine, develop more consistent BDNF levels similar to those unafflicted by the disorder. This return to normal-like BDNF fluctuations not only promotes generally healthier brain functioning but also reduced the total number of seizures experienced by the treated patients. Physical exercise increases BDNF levels via increased H3 acetylation and decreased expression of some relevant histone deacetylases. Some evidence has shown that physical exercise also has an impact on the expression of microRNAs related to neurodegeneration. The effects of microRNAs are thoroughly discussed above in the effects on cognition section. However, the mechanisms behind exercise and microRNA expression are not clear. Further study is required to understand how significant the interaction is between exercise and microRNA expression. One of the key functions of BDNF is to inhibit reactive oxygen species(ROS) which have been seen to damage cells and consequently discourage proper brain functioning. Physical exercise patients undergoing a high-intensity workout showed a notable increase in ROS that could significantly counter the benefits of moderate BDNF levels discussed prior. This finding suggests that low to moderate intensities are preferred treatment methods for those already at risk for neurological dysregulation. However, the detrimental effects of high intensity of workouts significantly diminish over time as the person naturally adapts to the oxidative stress that promotes ROS.

As mentioned previously, neurogenesis impairment is both an indicator and result of neurodegenerative diseases including epilepsy. Studies have shown that subjects manipulated to experience chronic epilepsy showed a significant reduction of granule cells in the dentate gyrus, a subsection of the hippocampus critical to neurogenesis. Those same studies then demonstrated how subjects treated with physical exercise showed a return to normal-like granule cell count consequently improving neurogenesis and brain functioning.

Physical exercise has demonstrated to have positive effects on the epigenetic modulation of BDNF levels and neurogenesis maintenance specifically in epileptic patients.

=== Alzheimer's Disease ===
Alzheimer's disease(AD) is characterized by significant decline in cognition and memory with evidence showing that physical exercise can slow its progression and even provide return of loss function(s) in some cases. One of the primary modes of AD is the loss or atypical functionality of microglia and astrocytes caused by excessive build-up of amyloid beta peptide plaque upon the brain. The amyloid beta plaque causes the microglia and astrocytes regulatory components to be improperly activated resulting in excessive and inaccurate immune response that targets healthy neurons. This interaction acts as a negative feedback loop that creates an environment prone to gross accumulation of amyloid beta plaque. Excessive amounts of amyloid beta plaque triggers improper regulatory mechanisms leading to further neuronal loss and decline in function. Studies have shown, in animal models and human patients alike, that consistent exercise inhibited the improper microglial activation mentioned previously through the production of certain myokines. Muscle cells respond to contractions by releasing molecules called myokines, one of which is critical to regulating microglial response, IL-6. This myokine is produced in response to consistent exercise and has direct influence on the up or down regulation of the inflammatory response involved in neuronal loss depending on signaling pathways. Also, IL-6 provokes the production of a cytokine known as IL-10 which can prevent the activation of microglia by blocking its receptors, effectively inhibiting harmful microglial activation mentioned prior. A number of patients afflicted by neurodegenerative diseases like AD have notably lower counts of IL-6 which could explain higher instances of dysfunctional inflammatory response. Although IL-6 can be artificially induced, long-term exercise is a non-pharmaceutical approach capable of producing IL-6 levels sufficient for normal regulatory processes.

Similar to epilepsy, exercise has increased BDNF levels in AD patients that were previously lacking. Physical exercise increases BDNF levels by increasing H3 acetylation and decreasing some relevant histone deacetylases. Brain-derived neurotrophic factor significantly reduces the neuroinflammation strongly associated with Alzheimer's disease and other disorders.

Physical exercise can play a critical role in regulating inflammatory pathways through the epigenetic modulation of myokine IL-6 and BDNF in AD patients.

== Effects on psychotic disorders ==
=== Schizophrenia ===
Schizophrenia is characterized by hallucinations, delusions, paranoia, and mood disorder symptoms with evidence showing that physical exercise can alleviate neuroinflammation that could be a root cause of this affective disorder. Although it is still uncertain what exactly causes this disorder, several explanations exist such as the dopaminergic and glutamatergic hypotheses. The dopaminergic hypothesis states that schizophrenia is caused by presynaptic dopamine dysregulation. This dysregulation stems from an abnormal increase in key dopamine receptors that results in its excessive release. The glutamatergic hypothesis was previously believed to be closely tied to excessive dopamine release mentioned. However, recent literature finds that the dysfunction of N-methyl-D-aspartate receptors(NMDAR) can serve as the mechanism behind schizophrenia. Dysfunction of NMDAR receptors causes increased levels of glutamate at non-NMDA sites. Higher generalized glutamate levels in the prefrontal cortex results in atypically high signaling at AMPA receptors. Abnormal signaling activity at the AMPA receptors disrupts cell excitability believed to be connected to schizophrenia. A relatively new explanation within the topic focuses on dysfunctional neuroinflammation pathways and oxidative stress similar to what has been discussed in disorders such as Alzheimer's disease. Patients afflicted with schizophrenia show a drastic increase in microglial activation and arachidonic acid signaling, both major inflammation contributors which are known to cause neuronal loss and reduced function. This combination of factors is particularly unique to Schizophrenia patients, so much so that a profile capable of identifying the extent of related inflammation by-products(cytokines and chemokines) is used to diagnose schizophrenia with approximately 90% accuracy. As discussed previously, consistent exercise produces greater amounts of myokine IL-6 which regulates inflammatory pathways and increases production of IL-10, a cytokine that inhibits microglial activation.

One of the primary characteristics of schizophrenia is the occurrence of acute psychosis incited by a range of stressful events depending on an individual's predisposition to stress response. An individual's stress response is in large part governed by the hypothalamic-pituitary-adrenal axis or HPA. The HPA is multistep biochemical process that results in the release of cortisol from the adrenal gland and consequently excessive dopamine release associated with psychosis. Those prone to affected disorders such as schizophrenia are believed to have inherently hyper-active HPA which makes them especially sensitive to stressors. Some studies have shown that moderate, long-term exercise has reduced psychotic symptoms by decreasing basal cortisol levels in patients. However, acute, short-term exercise has shown to cause an immediate increase cortisol levels due to the stressful nature of the activity. The key point being that consistent exercise over a substantial period of time results in a significantly lower baseline cortisol levels despite the short-term spikes caused by performing the activity. Generally lower cortisol levels reduces heightened dopamine release common in patients and brings cortisol levels closer to that of healthy control subjects. Although this is by no means a cure, it can notably improve the lives of those affected by mitigating symptoms and normalizing patient response to commons stressors.

Recent studies suggest that schizophrenia patients can benefit from long-term exercise which causes decreased neuroinflammation and basal cortisol levels associated with psychotic events. The epigenetic modulation of basal cortisol levels in schizophrenic patients is just one of several alterations related to this disorder.
