= Nucleosome repeat length =

Nucleosome repeat length (NRL) is the average distance between the centers of neighboring nucleosomes. NRL is an important physical chromatin property that determines its biological function. NRL can be determined genome-wide for the chromatin in a given cell type and state, or locally for a large enough genomic region containing several nucleosomes.

In chromatin, neighbouring nucleosomes are separated by the linker DNA and in many cases also by the linker histone H1 as well as non-histone proteins. Since the size of the nucleosome is typically fixed (146-147 base pairs), NRL is mostly determined by the size of the linker region between nucleosomes. Alternatively, partial DNA unwrapping from the histone octamer or partial disassembly of the histone octamer can decrease the effective nucleosome size and thus affect NRL.

Past studies going back to 1970s showed that, in general, NRL is different for different species and even for different cell types of the same organism. In addition, recent publications reported NRL variations for different genomic regions of the same cell type. Studies have compared NRL around yeast transcription start sites (TSSs) in vivo and that for the reconstituted chromatin on the same DNA sequences in vitro. It was shown that ordered nucleosome positioning arises only in the presence of ATP-dependent chromatin remodeling. Furthermore, it was reported that the NRL determined around yeast TSSs is an invariant value universal for a given wild type yeast strain, although it can change when one of chromatin remodelers is missing. In general, NRL depends on the DNA sequence, concentrations of histones and non-histone proteins, as well as long-range interactions between nucleosomes. NRL determines geometric properties of the nucleosome array, and therefore the higher-order packing of the DNA in chromatin, which might affect gene expression.

Recent works showed that NRL is shorter in some cancers in comparison to normal cells, and longer in older people.
