= HIST2H2AA3 =

Protein-coding gene in humans

H2AC18

Identifiers
- Aliases: H2AC18, H2A, H2A.2, H2A/O, H2A/q, H2AFO, H2a-615, HIST2H2AA, histone cluster 2, H2aa3, histone cluster 2 H2A family member a3, HIST2H2AA3, H2A clustered histone 18, H2AC19
- External IDs: OMIM: 142720; MGI: 2448283; GeneCards: H2AC18

Gene location (Human)
Chr.	Chromosome 1 (human)
Band	1q21.2	Start	149,842,218 bp
Band	1q21.2	End	149,842,750 bp

Gene location (Mouse)
Chr.	Chromosome 3 (mouse)
Band	3|3 F2.1	Start	96,147,065 bp
Band	3|3 F2.1	End	96,147,592 bp
RNA expression pattern
Bgee	Human / Mouse (ortholog); Top expressed in: stomach; blood; colon; Achilles tendon; testicle; corpus callosum; right lung; prostate / Top expressed in: white adipose tissue; uterus; granulocyte; adrenal gland; spermatocyte; proximal tubule; pancreas; urinary bladder; islet of Langerhans; muscle of thigh; More reference expression data
BioGPS	n/a
Gene ontology
Molecular function	DNA binding; protein heterodimerization activity; molecular function
Cellular component	nucleosome; extracellular exosome; nucleus; chromosome
Biological process	chromatin organization; biological process
Sources:Amigo / QuickGO
Orthologs
Databases	NCBI: entry; OMA: entry
Species	Human	Mouse
Entrez	8337	319192
Ensembl	ENSG00000288825	ENSMUSG00000063954
UniProt	Q6FI13	Q6GSS7
RefSeq (mRNA)	NM_003516	NM_178212
RefSeq (protein)	NP_001035807; NP_003507	NP_038577; NP_835584
Location (UCSC)	Chr 1: 149.84 – 149.84 Mb	Chr 3: 96.15 – 96.15 Mb
PubMed search
- Wikidata
View/Edit Human	View/Edit Mouse

Histone H2A type 2-A is a protein that in humans is encoded by the HIST2H2AA3 gene.

== Function ==
Histones are basic nuclear proteins that are responsible for the nucleosome structure of the chromosomal fiber in eukaryotes. Two molecules of each of the four core histones (H2A, H2B, H3, and H4) form an octamer, around which approximately 146 bp of DNA is wrapped in repeating units, called nucleosomes. The linker histone, H1, interacts with linker DNA between nucleosomes and functions in the compaction of chromatin into higher order structures. This gene is intronless and encodes a member of the histone H2A family. Transcripts from this gene lack polyA tails but instead contain a palindromic termination element. This gene is found in a histone cluster on chromosome 1. This gene is one of four histone genes in the cluster that are duplicated; this record represents the centromeric copy.
