= HIST1H2BD =

Protein-coding gene in the species Homo sapiens

H2BC5

Identifiers
- Aliases: H2BC5, H2B.1B, H2B/b, H2BFB, HIRIP2, dJ221C16.6, histone cluster 1, H2bd, histone cluster 1 H2B family member d, H2BFG, H2BFL, H2B/k, H2B/l, H2B/h, H2BFK, HIST1H2BE, HIST1H2BC, HIST1H2BG, HIST1H2BI, H2BFA, H2BFH, H2B/a, H2B/g, HIST1H2BF, HIST1H2BD, H2B clustered histone 5
- External IDs: OMIM: 602799; MGI: 1925553; GeneCards: H2BC5
Available structures
PDB	Ortholog search: PDBe RCSB
PDB	List of PDB id codes 5KGF

Gene location (Human)
Chr.	Chromosome 6 (human)
Band	6p22.2	Start	26,158,122 bp
Band	6p22.2	End	26,171,349 bp

Gene location (Mouse)
Chr.	Chromosome 11 (mouse)
Band	11|11 B1.3	Start	58,839,746 bp
Band	11|11 B1.3	End	58,840,359 bp
RNA expression pattern
Bgee	Human / Mouse (ortholog); Top expressed in: right uterine tube; Achilles tendon; mucosa of transverse colon; pylorus; prostate; epithelium of colon; tendon of biceps brachii; right lobe of liver; right ventricle; ganglionic eminence / Top expressed in: medial ganglionic eminence; ventricular zone; lens; spermatid; cerebellar cortex; trigeminal ganglion; spermatocyte; embryo; neural layer of retina; visual cortex; More reference expression data
BioGPS	n/a
Gene ontology
Molecular function	protein heterodimerization activity; DNA binding; molecular function; protein binding; identical protein binding
Cellular component	chromosome; nucleosome; extracellular exosome; nucleoplasm; nucleus; cytosol; extracellular space
Biological process	nucleosome assembly; protein ubiquitination; innate immune response in mucosa; defense response to bacterium; antimicrobial humoral immune response mediated by antimicrobial peptide
Sources:Amigo / QuickGO
Orthologs
Databases	NCBI: entry; OMA: entry
Species	Human	Mouse
Entrez	3017	78303
Ensembl	ENSG00000158373	ENSMUSG00000056895
UniProt	P58876; P62807	Q9D2U9
RefSeq (mRNA)	NM_021063; NM_138720	NM_030082
RefSeq (protein)	NP_066407; NP_619790; NP_003517; NP_001368918	NP_084358
Location (UCSC)	Chr 6: 26.16 – 26.17 Mb	Chr 11: 58.84 – 58.84 Mb
PubMed search
- Wikidata
View/Edit Human	View/Edit Mouse

Histone H2B type 1-D is a protein that in humans is encoded by the HIST1H2BD gene.

Histones are basic nuclear proteins that are responsible for the nucleosome structure of the chromosomal fiber in eukaryote. Nucleosomes consist of approximately 146 bp of DNA wrapped around a histone octamer composed of pairs of each of the four core histones (H2A, H2B, H3, and H4). The chromatin fiber is further compacted through the interaction of a linker histone, H1, with the DNA between the nucleosomes to form higher order chromatin structures. This gene is intronless and encodes a member of the histone H2B family. Two transcripts that encode the same protein have been identified for this gene, which is found in the large histone gene cluster on chromosome 6p22-p21.3.
