= HIST1H2AE =

Protein-coding gene in the species Homo sapiens

H2AC8

Identifiers
- Aliases: H2AC8, H2A.1, H2A.2, H2A/a, H2AFA, histone cluster 1, H2ae, histone cluster 1 H2A family member e, HIST1H2AE, H2A clustered histone 8, H2AC4
- External IDs: OMIM: 602786; MGI: 2448457; GeneCards: H2AC8
Available structures
PDB	Ortholog search: PDBe RCSB
PDB	List of PDB id codes 2CV5, 3A6N, 3AFA, 3AN2, 3AV1, 3AV2, 3AYW, 3AZE, 3AZF, 3AZG, 3AZH, 3AZI, 3AZJ, 3AZK, 3AZL, 3AZM, 3AZN, 3W96, 3W97, 3W98, 3W99, 3WKJ, 3WTP, 5CPJ, 5B0Z, 4YM5, 5AV9, 5AVB, 5AV5, 4YM6, 5CPI, 3X1V, 5AV6, 3X1S, 5AV8, 5CPK, 5AVC, 5B0Y, 4Z5T, 5B24, 2RVQ, 5B40, 5AY8, 5B2I, 5B2J

Gene location (Human)
Chr.	Chromosome 6 (human)
Band	6p22.2	Start	26,216,975 bp
Band	6p22.2	End	26,217,483 bp

Gene location (Mouse)
Chr.	Chromosome 13 (mouse)
Band	13|13 A3.1	Start	21,900,592 bp
Band	13|13 A3.1	End	21,900,984 bp
RNA expression pattern
Bgee	Human / Mouse (ortholog); Top expressed in: Achilles tendon; testicle; monocyte; gonad; bone marrow cell; right uterine tube; mucosa of transverse colon; prostate; amniotic fluid; epithelium of colon / Top expressed in: uterus; spermatid; yolk sac; embryo; bone marrow; genital tubercle; embryo; mesencephalon; neural tube; thymus; More reference expression data
BioGPS	n/a
Gene ontology
Molecular function	DNA binding; protein heterodimerization activity; protein binding
Cellular component	nucleosome; extracellular exosome; nucleus; chromosome
Biological process	negative regulation of cell population proliferation; chromatin organization
Sources:Amigo / QuickGO
Orthologs
Databases	NCBI: entry; OMA: entry
Species	Human	Mouse
Entrez	3012	319191
Ensembl	ENSG00000277075	ENSMUSG00000071516
UniProt	P04908	C0HKE2; B2RVF0; C0HKE1; C0HKE3; C0HKE5 C0HKE4; C0HKE6; C0HKE7; C0HKE8; C0HKE9
RefSeq (mRNA)	NM_021052	NM_178182
RefSeq (protein)	NP_003504	NP_835496; NP_835495; NP_835494; NP_835491; NP_835489 NP_783591; NP_835493; NP_835496; NP_835489; NP_835495; NP_835494; NP_835491; NP_835492; NP_783591; NP_001171015; NP_835489; NP_001171015; NP_835496; NP_835491; NP_835493; NP_835494; NP_835495; NP_835492; NP_783591; NP_835495; NP_835489; NP_835494; NP_835491; NP_835492; NP_783591; NP_001171015; NP_835493; NP_835496; NP_835494; NP_835489; NP_835495; NP_835491; NP_835492; NP_783591; NP_001171015; NP_835493; NP_835496; NP_835492; NP_835491; NP_835489; NP_835495; NP_835494; NP_783591; NP_001171015; NP_835493; NP_835496; NP_835491; NP_835489; NP_835495; NP_835494; NP_835492; NP_783591; NP_001171015; NP_835493; NP_835496; NP_783591; NP_835489; NP_835495; NP_835494; NP_835491; NP_835492; NP_001171015; NP_835493; NP_835496; NP_783591; NP_835489; NP_835495; NP_835494; NP_835491; NP_835492; NP_001171015; NP_835493; NP_835496
Location (UCSC)	Chr 6: 26.22 – 26.22 Mb	Chr 13: 21.9 – 21.9 Mb
PubMed search
- Wikidata
View/Edit Human	View/Edit Mouse

Histone H2A type 1-B/E is a protein that in humans is encoded by the HIST1H2AE gene.

Histones are basic nuclear proteins that are responsible for the nucleosome structure of the chromosomal fiber in eukaryotes. Nucleosomes consist of approximately 146 bp of DNA wrapped around a histone octamer composed of pairs of each of the four core histones (H2A, H2B, H3, and H4).

The chromatin fiber is further compacted through the interaction of a linker histone, H1, with the DNA between the nucleosomes to form higher order chromatin structures. This gene is intronless and encodes a member of the histone H2A family. Transcripts from this gene lack polyA tails; instead, they contain a palindromic termination element. This gene is found in the large histone gene cluster on chromosome 6p22-p21.3.
