= HIST1H2BB =

Protein-coding gene in the species Homo sapiens

H2BC3

Identifiers
- Aliases: H2BC3, H2B.1, H2B/f, H2BFF, histone cluster 1, H2bb, histone cluster 1 H2B family member b, HIST1H2BB, H2B clustered histone 3
- External IDs: OMIM: 602803; MGI: 2448377; GeneCards: H2BC3
Available structures
PDB	Ortholog search: PDBe RCSB
PDB	List of PDB id codes 3X1S, 3X1U

Gene location (Human)
Chr.	Chromosome 6 (human)
Band	6p22.2	Start	26,043,227 bp
Band	6p22.2	End	26,043,713 bp

Gene location (Mouse)
Chr.	Chromosome 13 (mouse)
Band	13|13 A3.1	Start	23,930,717 bp
Band	13|13 A3.1	End	23,931,224 bp
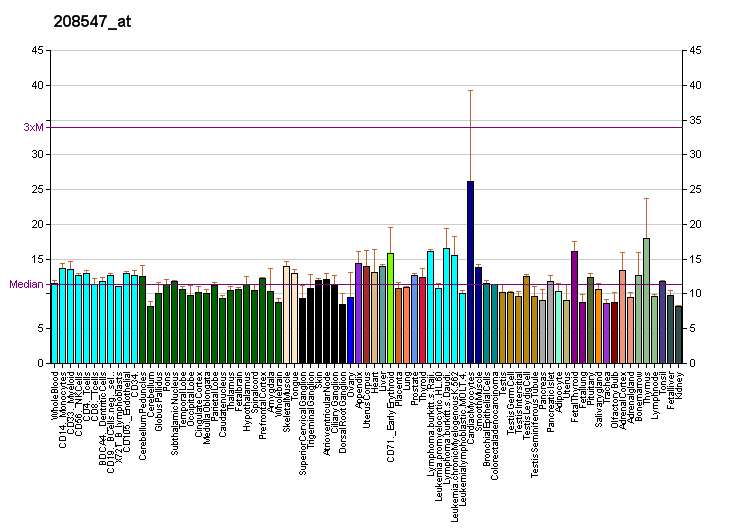
RNA expression pattern
Bgee	Human / Mouse (ortholog); Top expressed in: bone marrow cell; gonad; testicle; Achilles tendon; epithelium of colon; corpus callosum; oocyte; sural nerve; tonsil; thymus / Top expressed in: uterus; spermatocyte; genital tubercle; spermatid; granulocyte; embryo; embryo; tail of embryo; bone marrow; yolk sac; More reference expression data
BioGPS	More reference expression data
Gene ontology
Molecular function	protein heterodimerization activity; DNA binding; protein binding
Cellular component	nucleosome; nucleus; chromosome; nucleoplasm; cytosol
Biological process	nucleosome assembly; protein ubiquitination
Sources:Amigo / QuickGO
Orthologs
Databases	NCBI: entry; OMA: entry
Species	Human	Mouse
Entrez	3018	319178
Ensembl	ENSG00000276410	ENSMUSG00000075031
UniProt	P33778	Q64475
RefSeq (mRNA)	NM_021062	NM_175664
RefSeq (protein)	NP_066406	NP_783595
Location (UCSC)	Chr 6: 26.04 – 26.04 Mb	Chr 13: 23.93 – 23.93 Mb
PubMed search
- Wikidata
View/Edit Human	View/Edit Mouse

Histone H2B type 1-B is a protein that in humans is encoded by the HIST1H2BB gene.

Histones are basic nuclear proteins that are responsible for the nucleosome structure of the chromosomal fiber in eukaryotes. Nucleosomes consist of approximately 146 bp of DNA wrapped around a histone octamer composed of pairs of each of the four core histones (H2A, H2B, H3, and H4).

The chromatin fiber is further compacted through the interaction of a linker histone, H1, with the DNA between the nucleosomes to form higher order chromatin structures. This gene is intronless and encodes a member of the histone H2B family. Transcripts from this gene lack polyA tails; instead, they contain a palindromic termination element. This gene is found in the large histone gene cluster on chromosome 6p22-p21.3.
