= H1FOO =

Protein-coding gene in the species Homo sapiens

H1-8

Identifiers
- Aliases: H1-8, osH1, H1.8, H1oo, H1 histone family member O, oocyte specific, H1 histone family member O oocyte specific, H1.8 linker histone, H1FOO
- External IDs: MGI: 2176207; GeneCards: H1-8

Gene location (Human)
Chr.	Chromosome 3 (human)
Band	3q22.1	Start	129,543,175 bp
Band	3q22.1	End	129,551,467 bp

Gene location (Mouse)
Chr.	Chromosome 6 (mouse)
Band	6|6 E3	Start	115,921,899 bp
Band	6|6 E3	End	115,927,197 bp
RNA expression pattern
Bgee	Human / Mouse (ortholog); Top expressed in: oocyte; secondary oocyte; left testis; right testis; gonad; mucosa of nose; human musculoskeletal system; anterior pituitary; olfactory zone of nasal mucosa; muscular system / Top expressed in: zygote; secondary oocyte; primary oocyte; cardiac muscle tissue of left ventricle; extensor digitorum longus muscle; interventricular septum; plantaris muscle; embryo; cingulate gyrus; morula; More reference expression data
BioGPS	n/a
Gene ontology
Molecular function	DNA binding; nucleosomal DNA binding; double-stranded DNA binding; protein binding
Cellular component	cytoplasm; nucleosome; extracellular exosome; nucleolus; nucleus; chromosome; female germ cell nucleus
Biological process	nucleosome assembly; meiosis; regulation of DNA methylation; negative regulation of stem cell differentiation; regulation of transcription, DNA-templated; chromosome condensation; negative regulation of DNA recombination
Sources:Amigo / QuickGO
Orthologs
Databases	NCBI: entry; OMA: entry
Species	Human	Mouse
Entrez	132243	171506
Ensembl	ENSG00000178804	ENSMUSG00000042279
UniProt	Q8IZA3	Q8VIK3
RefSeq (mRNA)	NM_001308262; NM_153833	NM_138311; NM_001346702
RefSeq (protein)	NP_001295191; NP_722575	NP_001333631; NP_612184
Location (UCSC)	Chr 3: 129.54 – 129.55 Mb	Chr 6: 115.92 – 115.93 Mb
PubMed search
- Wikidata
View/Edit Human	View/Edit Mouse

Histone H1oo is a protein that in humans is encoded by the H1FOO gene.

== Function ==
Histones are basic nuclear proteins that are responsible for the nucleosome structure of the chromosomal fiber in eukaryotes. Nucleosomes consist of approximately 146 bp of DNA wrapped around a histone octamer composed of pairs of each of the four core histones (H2A, H2B, H3, and H4). The chromatin fiber is further compacted through the interaction of a linker histone, H1, with the DNA between the nucleosomes to form higher order chromatin structures. The protein encoded is a member of the histone H1 family. This gene contains introns, unlike most histone genes. The protein encoded is a member of the histone H1 family. The related mouse gene is expressed only in oocytes.

It incorporates into sperm chromatin after fertilisation.
