= Linker DNA =

DNA which binds two nucleoside cores together

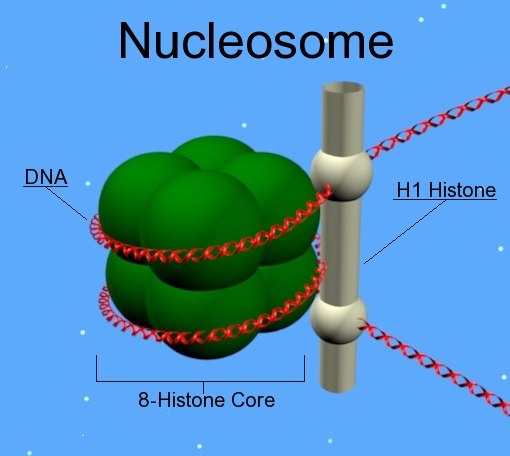
The H1 protein binds to the "linker DNA" (extending to the right) between nucleosomes (only one nucleosome is shown).

In molecular biology, linker DNA is double-stranded DNA between two nucleosome cores that, in association with histone H1, holds the cores together. Linker DNA is typically 10-100 base pairs long, depending on the genomic region, organism and cell type. The size of the linker DNA determines the Nucleosome Repeat Length (NRL). Linker DNA can be seen as the string in the "beads and string model", which is made by using an ionic solution on the chromatin. Linker DNA is often bound by linker histone H1. Nucleosome is technically the consolidation of a nucleosome core and one adjacent linker DNA segment; however, the term nucleosome is used freely for solely the core. Linker DNA may be degraded by endonucleases.

The linkers are short double stranded DNA segments which are formed of oligonucleotides. These contain target sites for the action of one or more restriction enzymes. The linkers can be synthesized chemically and can be ligated to the blunt end of foreign DNA or vector DNA. These are then treated with restriction endonuclease enzyme to produce cohesive ends of DNA fragments. The commonly used linkers are EcoRI-linkers and sal-I linkers.
