= Intracellular transport =

Directed movement of vesicles and substances within a cell

Intracellular transport is the movement of vesicles and substances within a cell. Intracellular transport is required for maintaining homeostasis within the cell by responding to physiological signals. Proteins synthesized in the cytosol are distributed to their respective organelles, according to their specific amino acid's sorting sequence. Eukaryotic cells transport packets of components to particular intracellular locations by attaching them to molecular motors that haul them along microtubules and actin filaments. Since intracellular transport heavily relies on microtubules for movement, the components of the cytoskeleton play a vital role in trafficking vesicles between organelles and the plasma membrane by providing mechanical support. Through this pathway, it is possible to facilitate the movement of essential molecules such as membrane‐bounded vesicles and organelles, mRNA, and chromosomes.

Intracellular transport between the Golgi apparatus and the endoplasmic reticulum

Intracellular transport is unique to eukaryotic cells because they possess organelles enclosed in membranes that need to be mediated for exchange of cargo to take place. Conversely, in prokaryotic cells, there is no need for this specialized transport mechanism because there are no membranous organelles and compartments to traffic between. Prokaryotes are able to subsist by allowing materials to enter the cell via simple diffusion. Intracellular transport is more specialized than diffusion; it is a multifaceted process which utilizes transport vesicles. Transport vesicles are small structures within the cell consisting of a fluid enclosed by a lipid bilayer that hold cargo. These vesicles will typically execute cargo loading and vesicle budding, vesicle transport, the binding of the vesicle to a target membrane and the fusion of the vesicle membranes to target membrane. To ensure that these vesicles embark in the right direction and to further organize the cell, special motor proteins attach to cargo-filled vesicles and carry them along the cytoskeleton. For example, they have to ensure that lysosomal enzymes are transferred specifically to the golgi apparatus and not to another part of the cell which could lead to deleterious effects.

== Fusion ==
Small membrane bound vesicles responsible for transporting proteins from one organelle to another are commonly found in endocytic and secretory pathways. Vesicles bud from their donor organelle and release the contents of their vesicle by a fusion event in a particular target organelle. The endoplasmic reticulum serves as a channel that proteins will pass through bound for their final destination. Outbound proteins from the endoplasmic reticulum will bud off into transport vesicles that travel along the cell cortex to reach their specific destinations. Since the ER is the site of protein synthesis, it would serve as the parent organelle, and the cis face of the golgi, where proteins and signals are received, would be the acceptor. In order for the transport vesicle to accurately undergo a fusion event, it must first recognize the correct target membrane then fuse with that membrane.

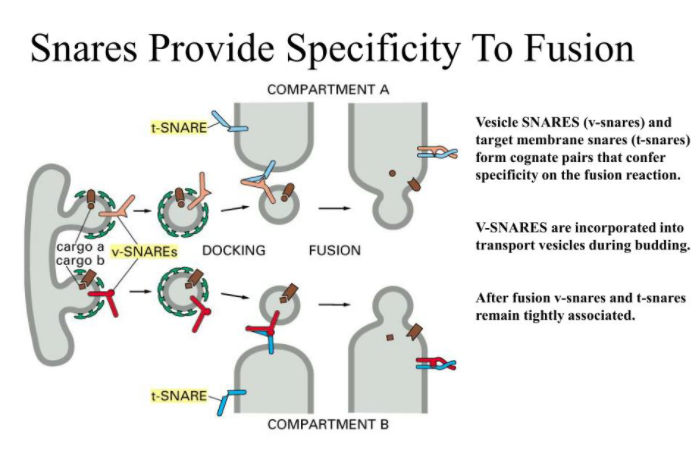
How SNARE proteins play a role in intracellular transport

Rab proteins on the surface of the transport vesicle are responsible for aligning with the complementary tethering proteins found on the respective organelle's cytosolic surface. This fusion event allows for the delivery of the vesicles contents mediated by proteins such as SNARE proteins. SNAREs are small, tail-anchored proteins which are often post-translationally inserted into membranes that are responsible for the fusion event necessary for vesicles to transport between organelles in the cytosol. There are two forms of SNARES, the t-SNARE and v-SNARE, which fit together similar to a lock and key. The t-SNAREs function by binding to the membranes of the target organelles, while the v-SNAREs function by binding to the vesicle membranes.

== Role of endocytosis ==
Intracellular transport is an overarching category of how cells obtain nutrients and signals. One very well understood form of intracellular transport is known as endocytosis. Endocytosis is defined as the uptake of material by the invagination of the plasma membrane. More specifically, eukaryotic cells use endocytosis of the uptake of nutrients, down regulation of growth factor receptors' and as a mass regulator of the signaling circuit. This method of transport is largely intercellular in lieu of uptake of large particles such as bacteria via phagocytosis in which a cell engulfs a solid particle to form an internal vesicle called a phagosome. However, many of these processes have an intracellular component. Phagocytosis is of great importance to intracellular transport because once a substance is deemed harmful and engulfed in a vesicle, it can be trafficked to the appropriate location for degradation. These endocytosed molecules are sorted into early endosomes within the cell, which serves to further sort these substances to the correct final destination (in the same way the Golgi does in the secretory pathway). From here, the early endosome starts a cascade of transport where the cargo is eventually hydrolyzed inside the lysosome for degradation. This capability is necessary for the degradation of any cargo that is harmful or unnecessary for the cell; this is commonly seen in response to foreign material. Phagocytosis has an immunologic function and role in apoptosis. Additionally, endocytosis can be observed through the nonspecific internalization of fluid droplets via pinocytosis and in receptor mediated endocytosis.

== Role of microtubules ==
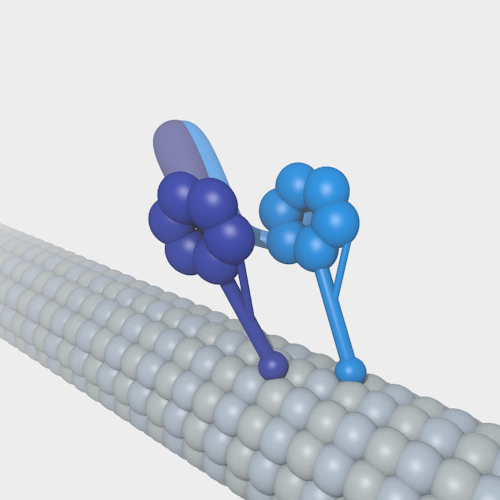
A cytoplasmic dynein motor bound to a microtubule.

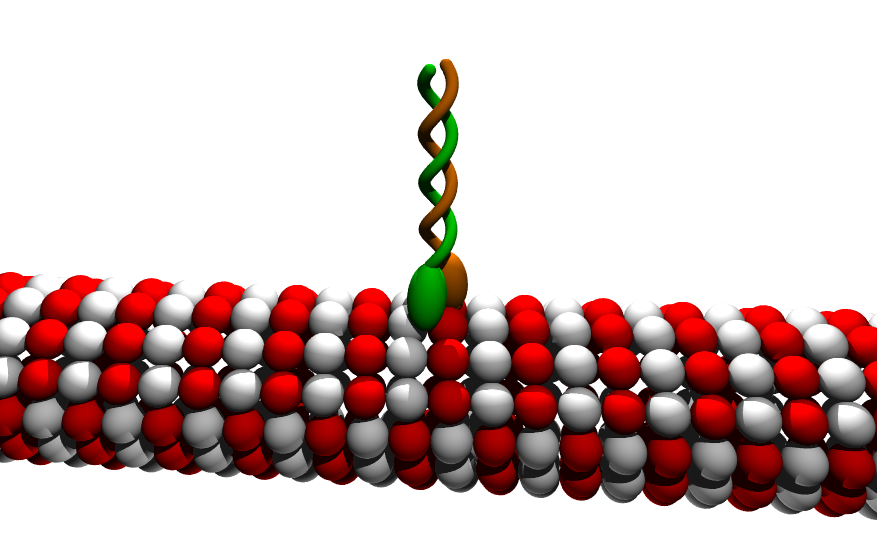
A kinesin molecule bound to a microtubule.

The transport mechanism depends on the material being moved. Intracellular transport that requires quick movement will use an actin-myosin mechanism while more specialized functions require microtubules for transport. Microtubules function as tracks in the intracellular transport of membrane-bound vesicles and organelles. This process is propelled by motor proteins such as dynein. Motor proteins connect the transport vesicles to microtubules and actin filaments to facilitate intracellular movement. Microtubules are organized so their plus ends extend through the periphery of the cells and their minus ends are anchored within the centrosome, so they utilize the motor proteins kinesin's (positive end directed) and dynein's (negative end directed) to transport vesicles and organelles in opposite directions through the cytoplasm. Each type of membrane vesicle is specifically bound to its own kinesin motor protein via binding within the tail domain. One of the major roles of microtubules is to transport membrane vesicles and organelles through the cytoplasm of eukaryotic cells. It is speculated that areas within the cell considered "microtubule-poor" are probably transported along microfilaments aided by a myosin motor protein. In this manner, microtubules assist the transport of chromosomes towards the spindle poles by utilizing the dynein motor proteins during anaphase.

== Diseases ==
By understanding the components and mechanisms of intracellular transport it is possible to see its implication in diseases. Defects encompass improper sorting of cargo into transport carriers, vesicle budding, issues in movement of vesicles along cytoskeletal tracks, and fusion at the target membrane. Since the life cycle of the cell is a highly regulated and important process, if any component goes awry there is the possibility for deleterious effects. If the cell is unable to correctly execute components of the intracellular pathway there is the impending possibility for protein aggregates to form. Growing evidence supports the concept that deficits in axonal transport contributes to pathogenesis in multiple neurodegenerative diseases. It is proposed that protein aggregations due to faulty transport is a leading cause of the development of ALS, Alzheimer's and dementia.

How microtubules play a role in intracellular transport * (HIF1A), * (Dynein), * (Importin), * (Cytoplasm), * (Nucleus), * (Septina)

On the other hand, targeting the intracellular transport processes of these motor proteins constitutes the possibility for pharmacological targeting of drugs. By understanding the method in which substances move along neurons or microtubules it is possible to target specific pathways for disease. Currently, many drug companies are aiming to utilize the trajectory of intracellular transport mechanisms to deliver drugs to localized regions and target cells without harming healthy neighboring cells. This type of treatment is being heavily researched to potentially create anti-cancer drugs.

== See also ==
- Transport by multiple-motor proteins
- Kinesin
- Adaptor protein
- Leelamine
- Dynactin
- MCOLN2
- KIF6, KIF5A, involved in intracellular organelle transport
- COG2, COG4, COG5, COG7
- Sterol carrier protein
