= Kinesin =

Eukaryotic motor protein

The kinesin dimer (red) attaches to, and moves along, microtubules (blue and green).

Animation of kinesin "walking" on a microtubule.

A kinesin is a protein complex belonging to a class of motor proteins found in eukaryotic cells. Kinesins move along microtubule (MT) filaments and are powered by the hydrolysis of adenosine triphosphate (ATP) (thus kinesins are ATPases, a type of enzyme). The active movement of kinesins supports several cellular functions including mitosis, meiosis and transport of cellular cargo, such as in axonal transport, and intraflagellar transport. Most kinesins walk towards the plus end of a microtubule, which, in most cells, entails transporting cargo such as protein and membrane components from the center of the cell towards the periphery. This form of transport is known as anterograde transport. In contrast, dyneins are motor proteins that move toward the minus end of a microtubule in retrograde transport.

== Discovery ==
The first kinesins to be discovered were microtubule-based anterograde intracellular transport motors in 1985, based on their motility in cytoplasm extruded from the giant axon of the squid.

The founding member of this superfamily, kinesin-1, was isolated as a heterotetrameric fast axonal organelle transport motor consisting of four parts: two identical motor subunits (called Kinesin Heavy Chain (KHC) molecules) and two other molecules each known as a Kinesin Light Chain (KLC). These were discovered via microtubule affinity purification from neuronal cell extracts. Subsequently, a different, heterotrimeric plus-end-directed MT-based motor named kinesin-2, consisting of two distinct KHC-related motor subunits and an accessory "KAP" subunit, was purified from echinoderm egg/embryo extracts and is best known for its role in transporting protein complexes (intraflagellar transport particles) along axonemes during ciliogenesis. Molecular genetic and genomic approaches have led to the recognition that the kinesins form a diverse superfamily of motors that are responsible for multiple intracellular motility events in eukaryotic cells. For example, the genomes of mammals encode more than 40 kinesin proteins, organized into at least 14 families named kinesin-1 through kinesin-14.

== Structure ==
=== Overall structure ===
Members of the kinesin superfamily vary in shape but the prototypical kinesin-1 motor consists of two Kinesin Heavy Chain (KHC) molecules which form a protein dimer (molecule pair) that binds two light chains (KLCs), which are unique for different cargos.

The heavy chain of kinesin-1 comprises a globular head (the motor domain) at the amino terminal end connected via a short, flexible neck linker to the stalk – a long, central alpha-helical coiled coil domain – that ends in a carboxy terminal tail domain which associates with the light-chains. The stalks of two KHCs intertwine to form a coiled coil that directs dimerization of the two KHCs. In most cases transported cargo binds to the kinesin light chains, at the TPR motif sequence of the KLC, but in some cases cargo binds to the C-terminal domains of the heavy chains.

=== Kinesin motor domain ===
Kinesin motor domain
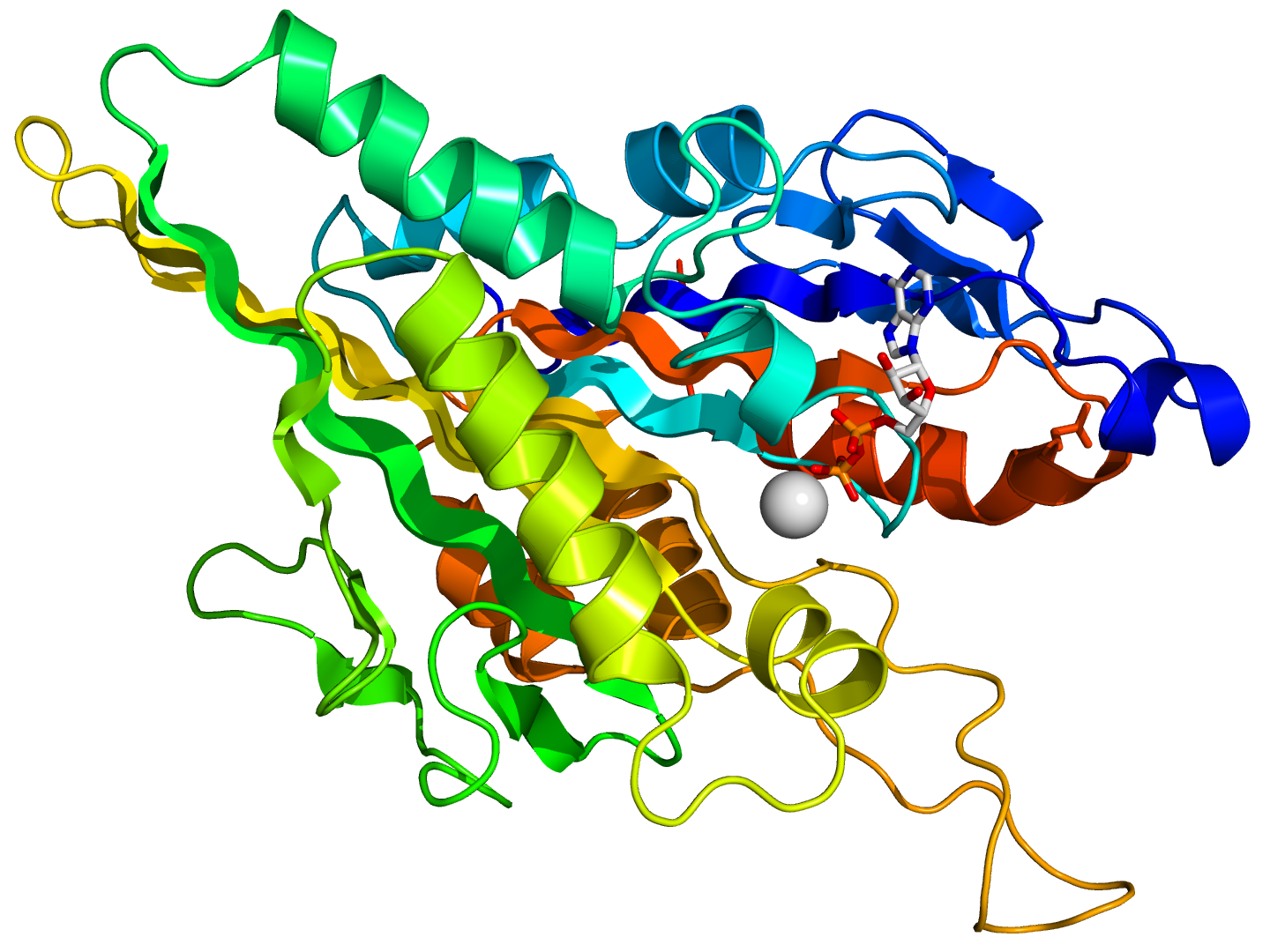
- Crystallographic structure of the human kinesin motor domain depicted as a rainbow colored cartoon (N-terminus = blue, C-terminus = red) complexed with ADP (stick diagram, carbon = white, oxygen = red, nitrogen = blue, phosphorus = orange) and a magnesium ion (grey sphere).

Identifiers
- Symbol: Kinesin motor domain
- Pfam: PF00225
- InterPro: IPR001752
- SMART: SM00129
- PROSITE: PS50067
- SCOP2: 1bg2 / SCOPe / SUPFAM
- CDD: cd00106
Available protein structures:
- PDB: IPR001752 PF00225 (ECOD; PDBsum)
- AlphaFold: IPR001752; PF00225

The head is the signature of kinesin and its amino acid sequence is well conserved among various kinesins. Each head has two separate binding sites: one for the microtubule and the other for ATP. ATP binding and hydrolysis as well as ADP release change the conformation of the microtubule-binding domains and the orientation of the neck linker with respect to the head; this results in the motion of the kinesin. Several structural elements in the head, including a central beta-sheet domain and the Switch I and II domains, have been implicated as mediating the interactions between the two binding sites and the neck domain. Kinesins are structurally related to G proteins, which hydrolyze GTP instead of ATP. Several structural elements are shared between the two families, notably the Switch I and Switch II domain.

Mobile and self-inhibited conformations of kinesin-1. Self-inhibited conformation:IAK region of the tail (green) binds to motor domains (yellow and orange) to inhibit the enzymatic cycle of kinesin-1.Mobile conformation: Absent the tail binding, kinesin-1 motor domains (yellow and orange) can move freely along the microtubule(MT). PDB 2Y65; PDB 2Y5W.

Detailed view of kinesin-1 self-inhibition (one of two possible conformations shown). Highlight: positively charged residues (blue) of the IAK region interact at multiple locations with negatively charged residues (red) of the motor domains PDB 2Y65

=== Basic kinesin regulation ===
Kinesins tend to have low basal enzymatic activity which becomes significant when microtubule-activated. In addition, many members of the kinesin superfamily can be self-inhibited by the binding of tail domain to the motor domain. Such self-inhibition can then be relieved via additional regulation such as binding to cargo, cargo adapters or other microtubule-associated proteins.

== Cargo transport ==
In the cell, small molecules, such as gases and glucose, diffuse to where they are needed. Large molecules synthesised in the cell body, intracellular components such as vesicles and organelles such as mitochondria are too large (and the cytosol too crowded) to be able to diffuse to their destinations. Motor proteins fulfill the role of transporting large cargo about the cell to their required destinations. Kinesins are motor proteins that transport such cargo by walking unidirectionally along microtubule tracks hydrolysing one molecule of adenosine triphosphate (ATP) at each step. It was thought that ATP hydrolysis powered each step, the energy released propelling the head forwards to the next binding site. However, it has been proposed that the head diffuses forward and the force of binding to the microtubule is what pulls the cargo along. In addition viruses, HIV for example, exploit kinesins to allow virus particle shuttling after assembly.

There is significant evidence that cargoes in-vivo are transported by multiple motors in some cases by distinct forms of same-polarity kinesin motors that cooperate to optimize transport.

== Direction of motion ==
Motor proteins travel in a specific direction along a microtubule. Microtubules are polar; meaning, the heads only bind to the microtubule in one orientation, while ATP binding gives each step its direction through a process known as neck linker zippering.

It has been previously known that kinesin move cargo towards the plus (+) end of a microtubule, also known as anterograde transport/orthograde transport. However, it has been recently discovered that in budding yeast cells kinesin Cin8 (a member of the Kinesin-5 family) can move toward the minus end as well, or retrograde transport. This means, these unique yeast kinesin homotetramers have the novel ability to move bi-directionally. Kinesin, so far, has only been shown to move toward the minus end when in a group, with motors sliding in the antiparallel direction in an attempt to separate microtubules. This dual directionality has been observed in identical conditions where free Cin8 molecules move towards the minus end, but cross-linking Cin8 move toward the plus ends of each cross-linked microtubule. One specific study tested the speed at which Cin8 motors moved, their results yielded a range of about 25-55 nm/s, in the direction of the spindle poles. On an individual basis it has been found that by varying ionic conditions Cin8 motors can become as fast as 380 nm/s. It is suggested that the bidirectionality of yeast kinesin-5 motors such as Cin8 and Cut7 is a result of coupling with other Cin8 motors and helps to fulfill the role of dynein in budding yeast, as opposed to the human homologue of these motors, the plus directed Eg5. This discovery in kinesin-14 family proteins (such as Drosophila melanogaster NCD, budding yeast KAR3, and Arabidopsis thaliana ATK5) allows kinesin to walk in the opposite direction, toward microtubule minus end. This is not typical of kinesin, rather, an exception to the normal direction of movement.

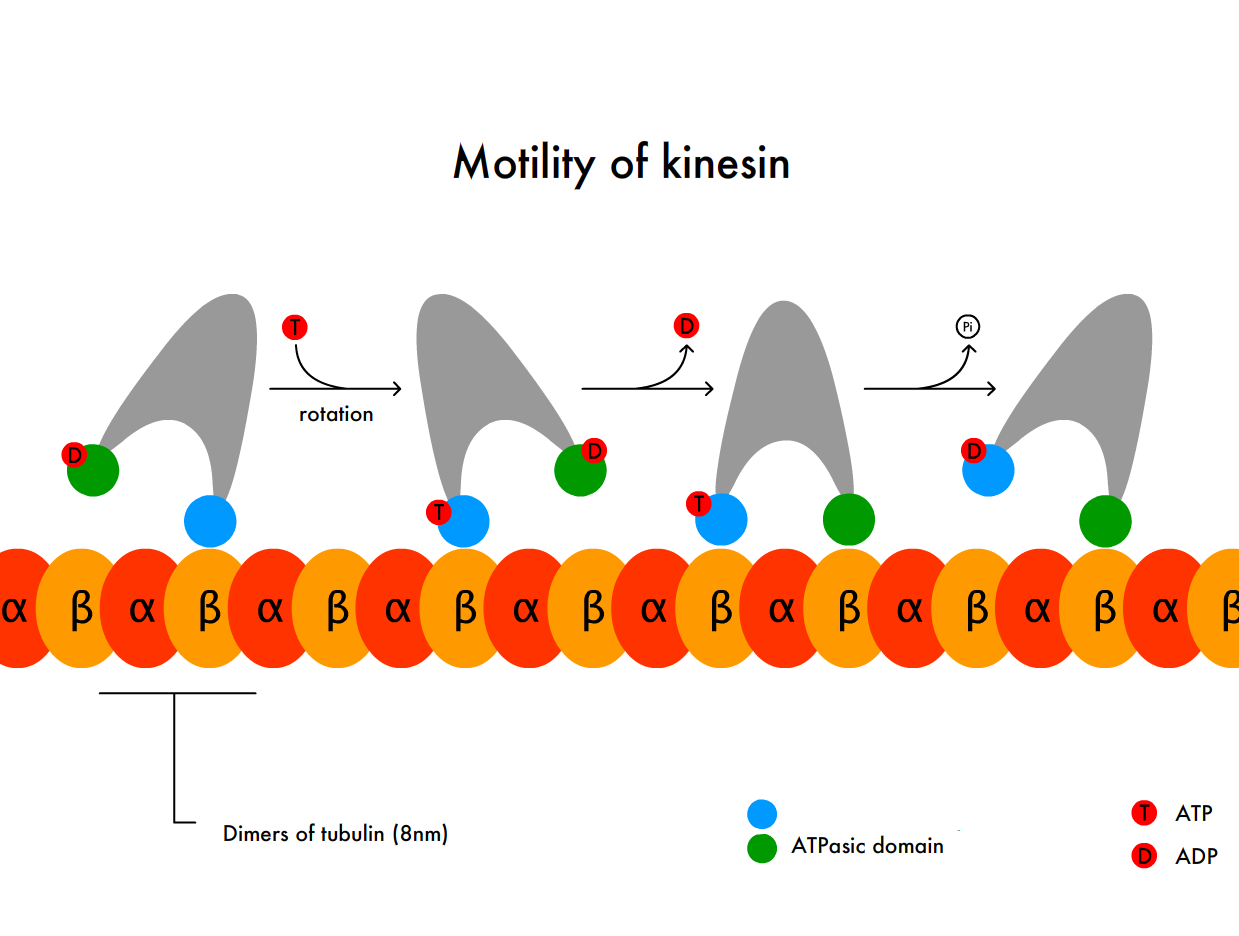
Diagram illustrating motility of kinesin.

Another type of motor protein, known as dyneins, move towards the minus end of the microtubule. Thus, they transport cargo from the periphery of the cell towards the center. An example of this would be transport occurring from the terminal boutons of a neuronal axon to the cell body (soma). This is known as retrograde transport.

== Mechanism of movement ==
In 2023 direct visualization of kinesin "walking" along a microtubule in real-time was reported. In a "hand-over-hand" mechanism, the kinesin heads step past one another, alternating the lead position. Thus in each step the leading head becomes the trailing head, while the trailing head becomes the leading head.

- This cycle begins with the trailing head releasing inorganic phosphate (Pi) derived from the hydrolysis of ATP.
- The trailing head detaches from the microtubule and rotates into its rightward displaced unbound state.
- The leading head binds ATP which causes the neck linker to dock to it, which moves the trailing head around the leading head into a position further along the microtubule in the direction of travel. The trailing head remains unbound.
- The ATP in the leading head is hydrolyzed.
- The trailing head releases its ADP and then binds to the microtubule becoming the leading head.

== Theoretical modeling ==
A number of theoretical models of the molecular motor protein kinesin have been proposed. Many challenges are encountered in theoretical investigations given the remaining uncertainties about the roles of protein structures, the precise way energy from ATP is transformed into mechanical work, and the roles played by thermal fluctuations. This is a rather active area of research. There is a need especially for approaches which better make a link with the molecular architecture of the protein and data obtained from experimental investigations.

The single-molecule dynamics are already well described but it seems that these nano scale machines typically work in large teams.

Single-molecule dynamics are based on the distinct chemical states of the motor and observations about its mechanical steps. For small concentrations of adenosine diphosphate, the motor's behaviour is governed by the competition of two chemomechanical motor cycles which determine the motor's stall force. A third cycle becomes important for large ADP concentrations. Models with a single cycle have been discussed too. Seiferth et al. demonstrated how quantities such as the velocity or the entropy production of a motor change when adjacent states are merged in a multi-cyclic model until eventually the number of cycles is reduced.

Recent experimental research has shown that kinesins, while moving along microtubules, interact with each other, the interactions being short range and weak attractive (1.6±0.5 K_{B}T). One model that has been developed takes into account these particle interactions, where the dynamic rates change accordingly with the energy of interaction. If the energy is positive the rate of creating bonds (q) will be higher while the rate of breaking bonds (r) will be lower. One can understand that the rates of entrance and exit in the microtubule will be changed as well by the energy (See figure 1 in reference 30). If the second site is occupied the rate of entrance will be α*q and if the last but one site is occupied the rate of exit will be β*r. This theoretical approach agrees with the results of Monte Carlo simulations for this model, especially for the limiting case of very large negative energy. The normal totally asymmetric simple exclusion process for (or TASEP) results can be recovered from this model making the energy equal to zero.

$${q\over r} = e^{E\over K_B T}$$

== Mitosis ==
In recent years, it has been found that microtubule-based molecular motors (including a number of kinesins) have a role in mitosis (cell division). Kinesins are important for proper spindle length and are involved in sliding microtubules apart within the spindle during prometaphase and metaphase, as well as depolymerizing microtubule minus ends at centrosomes during anaphase. Specifically, Kinesin-5 family proteins act within the spindle to slide microtubules apart, while the Kinesin 13 family act to depolymerize microtubules, as hypothesized, for example, in a model for anaphase B.

== Kinesin superfamily ==
Human kinesin superfamily members include the following proteins, which in the standardized nomenclature developed by the community of kinesin researchers, are organized into 14 families named kinesin-1 through kinesin-14:

- 1A – KIF1A, 1B – KIF1B, 1C – KIF1C = kinesin-3
- 2A – KIF2A, 2C – KIF2C = kinesin-13
- 3B – KIF3B or 3C – KIF3C ，3A - KIF3A = kinesin-2
- 4A – KIF4A, 4B – KIF4B = kinesin-4
- 5A – KIF5A, 5B – KIF5B, 5C – KIF5C = kinesin-1
- 6 – KIF6 = kinesin-9
- 7 – KIF7 = kinesin-4
- 9 – KIF9 = kinesin-9
- 11 – KIF11 = kinesin-5
- 12 – KIF12 = kinesin-12
- 13A – KIF13A, 13B – KIF13B = kinesin-3
- 14 – KIF14 = kinesin-3
- 15 – KIF15 = kinesin-12
- 16B – KIF16B = kinesin-3
- 17 – KIF17 = kinesin-2
- 18A – KIF18A, 18B – KIF18B = kinesin-8
- 19 – KIF19 = kinesin-8
- 20A – KIF20A, 20B – KIF20B = kinesin-6
- 21A – KIF21A, 21B – KIF21B = kinesin-4
- 22 – KIF22 = kinesin-10
- 23 – KIF23 = kinesin-6
- 24 – KIF24 = kinesin-13
- 25 – KIF25 = kinesin-14
- 26A – KIF26A, 26B – KIF26B = kinesin-11
- 27 – KIF27 = kinesin-4
- C1 – KIFC1, C2 – KIFC2, C3 – KIFC3 = kinesin-14

kinesin-1 light chains:

- 1 – KLC1, 2 – KLC2, 3 – KLC3, 4 – KLC4

kinesin-2 associated protein:

- KIFAP3 (also known as KAP-1, KAP3)

== See also ==
- Axonal transport
- Dynein
- Intraflagellar transport along cilia
- Kinesin 8
- Kinesin 13
- KRP
- Molecular motor
- Transport by multiple-motor proteins
