= Kinesin 13 =

The Kinesin-13 Family are a subfamily of motor proteins known as kinesins. Most kinesins transport materials or cargo around the cell while traversing along microtubule polymer tracks with the help of ATP-hydrolysis-created energy.

== Structure ==
They are easily identified by their three typical structural components including a highly conserved structural domain, catalytic core, and microtubule binding sites. The kinesin-13 family, unlike other kinesins, has an internally positioned motor domain. They were initially named KIF-M because of the unique location of their catalytic core in the middle of the polypeptide between the N-terminal globular domain and the C-terminal stalk but they are truly special due to their versatile nature. The Kinesin-13 family's molecular mechanism is less understood than other classes of kinesins which have their motor domains at one end of the molecule or the other. They are capable of traveling to both the minus and plus ends of microtubules whereas most motors are unidirectional. Thus they can catalytically depolymerize a microtubule from both ends making it a very efficient process.

The exact mechanism of Kinesin-13 activated microtubule depolymerization remains unclear, however, recent biochemical and structural studies revealed some more detailed class specific features enabling researchers to formulate a model.) The protein first contacts the side wall of a microtubule. This is not a stable interaction because the convex surface of the catalytic core does not fit to the flat surface of the straight microtubule protofilament. Steric hindrance between the molecule neck and adjacent protofilament further inhibits full contact between protein and the microtubule and only facilitates one-dimensional diffusion along the microtubule. At this time, the protein's nucleotide binding pocket is trapped in an open state so that the structure is not hydrolyzing ATP. Once the motor reaches the end of the microtubule, the protofilament spontaneously curves itself allowing motor to make full contact with the tubulin subunit. More MCAK molecules collectively bind to the curved region supporting the theory that they do not actively peel away the microtubule but they wait patiently for it to adopt this curved conformation. They stabilize the curved conformation by binding to the end of the microtubule and then catalyze depolymerization.

== Functions during mitosis ==
The major function of mitosis is to separate replicated sister chromatids, and this is accomplished in part during anaphase A when "kinetochore microtubules (or kMTs)" that link the sister chromatids to opposite spindle poles shorten by depolymerization, exerting forces on the chromatids that pull them to the poles. In Drosophila there is evidence that sister chromatids are moved to opposite spindle poles by a "kinesin-13 dependent pacman-flux mechanism" in which one kinesin-13 isoform, KLP59c, localized to kinetochores facilitates the depolymerization of the end of the kMTs facing the chromatid (pacman), whereas a second kinesin-13 isoform, KLP10A, localized on the spindle poles facilitates the depolymerization of the opposite end of the kMTs facing the poles (flux)

== See also ==
- KIF13A
