= KIF4B =

Motor protein found in humans

Identifiers
- Aliases: KIF4B, kinesin family member 4B
- External IDs: OMIM: 609184; GeneCards: KIF4B

Gene location (Human)
| Chr. | Chromosome 5 (human) |
| Band | 5q33.2 | Start | 155,013,755 bp |
| Band | 5q33.2 | End | 155,018,141 bp |
RNA expression pattern
| Bgee | Human / Mouse (ortholog); Top expressed in: testicle; left testis; ventricular zone; right testis / n/a; More reference expression data |
| BioGPS | n/a |
Gene ontology
| Molecular function | microtubule binding; DNA binding; nucleotide binding; ATP binding; plus-end-directed microtubule motor activity; microtubule motor activity; ATPase activity |
| Cellular component | nuclear matrix; cytoplasm; cytosol; microtubule; cytoskeleton; kinesin complex; nucleus; nucleoplasm; intercellular bridge |
| Biological process | mitotic cytokinesis; microtubule-based movement; antigen processing and presentation of exogenous peptide antigen via MHC class II; mitotic spindle midzone assembly; retrograde vesicle-mediated transport, Golgi to endoplasmic reticulum; mitotic spindle organization |
Sources:Amigo / QuickGO
Orthologs
| Databases | NCBI: entry; OMA: entry |
| Species | Human | Mouse |
| Entrez | 285643 | n/a |
| Ensembl | ENSG00000226650 | n/a |
| UniProt | Q2VIQ3 | n/a |
| RefSeq (mRNA) | NM_001099293 | n/a |
| RefSeq (protein) | NP_001092763 | n/a |
| Location (UCSC) | Chr 5: 155.01 – 155.02 Mb | n/a |
| PubMed search | | n/a |
- Wikidata
| View/Edit Human |

KIF4B is a human protein encoded by the gene KIF4B. It is part of the kinesin family of motor proteins.

== Function ==
KIF4B and the closely related protein KIF4A are essential for regulating anaphase spindle dynamics during mitosis.
