= Kinesin 8 =

The Kinesin 8 Family are a subfamily of the molecular motor proteins known as kinesins. Most kinesins transport materials or cargo around the cell while traversing along microtubule polymer tracks with the help of ATP-hydrolysis-created energy. The Kinesin 8 family has been shown to play an important role in chromosome alignment during mitosis. Kinesin 8 family members KIF18A in humans and Kip3 in yeast have been shown to be in vivo plus-end directed microtubule depolymerizers. During prometaphase of mitosis, the microtubules attach to the kinetochores of sister chromatids. Kinesin 8 is thought to play some role in this process, as knockdown of this protein via siRNA produces a phenotype of sister chromatids that are unable to align properly.
