= KIF18B =

Mammalian protein found in homo sapiens

Identifiers
- Aliases: KIF18B, kinesin family member 18B
- External IDs: OMIM: 614570; MGI: 2446979; GeneCards: KIF18B

Gene location (Human)
Chr.	Chromosome 17 (human)
Band	17q21.31	Start	44,924,709 bp
Band	17q21.31	End	44,947,773 bp

Gene location (Mouse)
Chr.	Chromosome 11 (mouse)
Band	11|11 E1	Start	102,796,355 bp
Band	11|11 E1	End	102,815,950 bp
RNA expression pattern
Bgee	Human / Mouse (ortholog); Top expressed in: trabecular bone; ventricular zone; secondary oocyte; embryo; thymus; ganglionic eminence; gingival epithelium; bone marrow; mucosa of transverse colon; gonad / Top expressed in: zygote; tail of embryo; ventricular zone; hand; genital tubercle; epiblast; spermatid; yolk sac; oocyte; primary oocyte; More reference expression data
BioGPS	n/a
Gene ontology
Molecular function	nucleotide binding; microtubule binding; protein binding; kinesin binding; cytoskeletal motor activity; ATP binding; microtubule motor activity; ATPase activity; plus-end-directed microtubule motor activity
Cellular component	cytoplasm; microtubule end; kinesin complex; astral microtubule; microtubule plus-end; microtubule; cytoskeleton; nucleus; cytosol; nuclear body; mitotic spindle astral microtubule; mitotic spindle midzone
Biological process	regulation of cell division; cell division; microtubule-based movement; mitotic sister chromatid segregation; cell cycle; microtubule depolymerization; mitotic cell cycle
Sources:Amigo / QuickGO
Orthologs
Databases	NCBI: entry; OMA: entry
Species	Human	Mouse
Entrez	146909	70218
Ensembl	ENSG00000186185	ENSMUSG00000051378
UniProt	Q86Y91	Q6PFD6
RefSeq (mRNA)	NM_001080443; NM_001264573; NM_001265577	NM_197959
RefSeq (protein)	NP_001251503; NP_001252506	NP_932063
Location (UCSC)	Chr 17: 44.92 – 44.95 Mb	Chr 11: 102.8 – 102.82 Mb
PubMed search
- Wikidata
View/Edit Human	View/Edit Mouse

Kinesin family member 18B (KIF18B), also known as kinesin-8, is a human protein encoded by the KIF18B gene. It is part of the kinesin family of motor proteins.
