= KIF21A =

Protein-coding gene in humans

Identifiers
- Aliases: KIF21A, CFEOM1, FEOM1, FEOM3A, kinesin family member 21A
- External IDs: OMIM: 608283; MGI: 109188; GeneCards: KIF21A

Gene location (Human)
Chr.	Chromosome 12 (human)
Band	12q12	Start	39,293,228 bp
Band	12q12	End	39,443,390 bp

Gene location (Mouse)
Chr.	Chromosome 15 (mouse)
Band	15 E3|15 45.86 cM	Start	90,817,479 bp
Band	15 E3|15 45.86 cM	End	90,934,151 bp
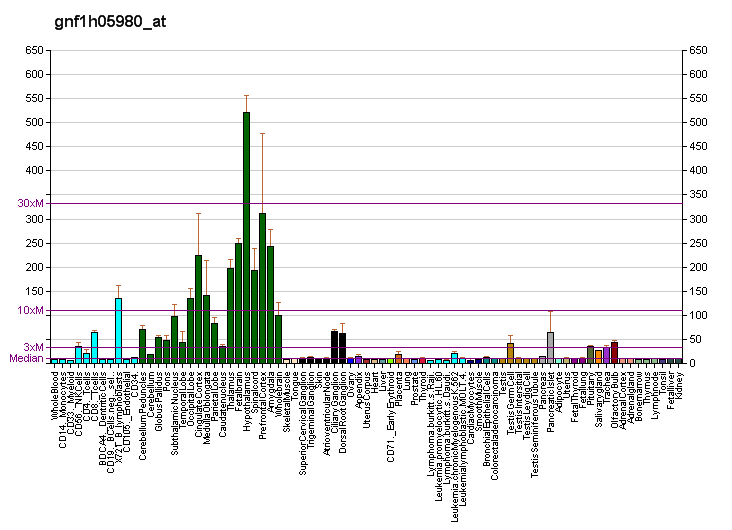
RNA expression pattern
Bgee	Human / Mouse (ortholog); Top expressed in: spinal ganglia; pars compacta; pons; superior vestibular nucleus; lateral nuclear group of thalamus; pars reticulata; bronchial epithelial cell; palpebral conjunctiva; Brodmann area 23; ventral tegmental area / Top expressed in: habenula; facial motor nucleus; ventricular zone; dorsomedial hypothalamic nucleus; primary motor cortex; mammillary body; ventromedial nucleus; medial vestibular nucleus; central gray substance of midbrain; lateral hypothalamus; More reference expression data
BioGPS	More reference expression data
Gene ontology
Molecular function	microtubule binding; microtubule motor activity; nucleotide binding; ATPase activity; protein binding; ATP binding
Cellular component	cytoplasm; microtubule; cytoskeleton; kinesin complex; cytosol; plasma membrane
Biological process	microtubule-based movement
Sources:Amigo / QuickGO
Orthologs
Databases	NCBI: entry; OMA: entry
Species	Human	Mouse
Entrez	55605	16564
Ensembl	ENSG00000139116	ENSMUSG00000022629
UniProt	Q7Z4S6	Q9QXL2
RefSeq (mRNA)	NM_001173463; NM_001173464; NM_001173465; NM_017641; NM_001378439 NM_001378440; NM_001378441	NM_001109040; NM_001109041; NM_001109042; NM_016705; NM_001358050
RefSeq (protein)	NP_001166934; NP_001166935; NP_001166936; NP_060111; NP_001365368 NP_001365369; NP_001365370	NP_001102510; NP_001102511; NP_001102512; NP_057914; NP_001344979
Location (UCSC)	Chr 12: 39.29 – 39.44 Mb	Chr 15: 90.82 – 90.93 Mb
PubMed search
- Wikidata
View/Edit Human	View/Edit Mouse

Kinesin-like protein KIF21A is a protein that in humans is encoded by the KIF21A gene.

KIF21A belongs to a family of plus end-directed kinesin motor proteins. Neurons use kinesin and dynein microtubule-dependent motor proteins to transport essential cellular components along axonal and dendritic microtubules.
