= KIF24 =

Protein-coding gene in the species Homo sapiens

Identifiers
- Aliases: KIF24, C9orf48, bA571F15.4, kinesin family member 24
- External IDs: OMIM: 613747; MGI: 1918345; GeneCards: KIF24

Gene location (Human)
Chr.	Chromosome 9 (human)
Band	9p13.3	Start	34,252,380 bp
Band	9p13.3	End	34,329,268 bp

Gene location (Mouse)
Chr.	Chromosome 4 (mouse)
Band	4|4 A5	Start	41,390,745 bp
Band	4|4 A5	End	41,464,887 bp
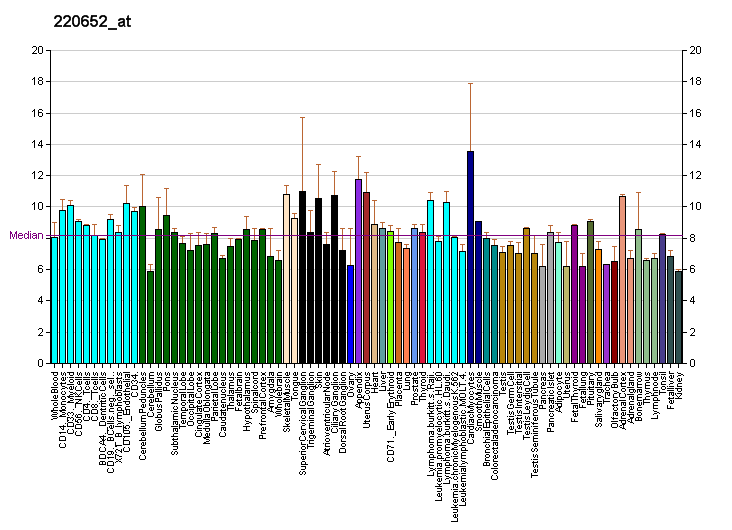
RNA expression pattern
Bgee	Human / Mouse (ortholog); Top expressed in: gonad; ventricular zone; testicle; right testis; left testis; right uterine tube; ganglionic eminence; stromal cell of endometrium; olfactory zone of nasal mucosa; bone marrow cell / Top expressed in: morula; lumbar subsegment of spinal cord; zygote; hand; secondary oocyte; spermatocyte; tail of embryo; primary oocyte; genital tubercle; spermatid; More reference expression data
BioGPS	More reference expression data
Gene ontology
Molecular function	microtubule binding; microtubule motor activity; nucleotide binding; ATPase activity; protein binding; ATP binding; identical protein binding
Cellular component	cytoplasm; centriole; cytosol; microtubule; cytoskeleton; kinesin complex; protein-containing complex
Biological process	microtubule-based movement; microtubule depolymerization; cell projection organization; cilium assembly; ciliary basal body-plasma membrane docking
Sources:Amigo / QuickGO
Orthologs
Databases	NCBI: entry; OMA: entry
Species	Human	Mouse
Entrez	347240	109242
Ensembl	ENSG00000186638	ENSMUSG00000028438
UniProt	Q5T7B8	Q6NWW5
RefSeq (mRNA)	NM_194313	NM_024241; NM_145101
RefSeq (protein)	NP_919289	NP_077203
Location (UCSC)	Chr 9: 34.25 – 34.33 Mb	Chr 4: 41.39 – 41.46 Mb
PubMed search
- Wikidata
View/Edit Human	View/Edit Mouse

Kinesin-like protein KIF24 is a protein that in humans is encoded by the KIF24 gene. It is part of the kinesin family of motor proteins.
