= KIF27 =

Motor protein in humans

Identifiers
- Aliases: KIF27, kinesin family member 27
- External IDs: OMIM: 611253; MGI: 1922300; GeneCards: KIF27

Gene location (Human)
Chr.	Chromosome 9 (human)
Band	9q21.32	Start	83,834,099 bp
Band	9q21.32	End	83,921,465 bp

Gene location (Mouse)
Chr.	Chromosome 13 (mouse)
Band	13|13 B1	Start	58,435,316 bp
Band	13|13 B1	End	58,506,936 bp
RNA expression pattern
Bgee	Human / Mouse (ortholog); Top expressed in: right uterine tube; testicle; Achilles tendon; left testis; corpus callosum; right testis; ventricular zone; gonad; endometrium; ganglionic eminence / Top expressed in: spermatid; spermatocyte; seminiferous tubule; Epithelium of choroid plexus; olfactory epithelium; embryo; zygote; choroid plexus of fourth ventricle; lateral ventricle; choroid plexus of lateral ventricle; More reference expression data
BioGPS	n/a
Gene ontology
Molecular function	microtubule binding; nucleotide binding; ATP binding; microtubule motor activity; plus-end-directed microtubule motor activity; ATPase activity
Cellular component	cytoplasm; cell projection; cilium; microtubule; cytoskeleton; kinesin complex; extracellular region
Biological process	microtubule-based movement; cell projection organization; epithelial cilium movement involved in extracellular fluid movement; ventricular system development; cilium assembly
Sources:Amigo / QuickGO
Orthologs
Databases	NCBI: entry; OMA: entry
Species	Human	Mouse
Entrez	55582	75050
Ensembl	ENSG00000165115	ENSMUSG00000060176
UniProt	Q86VH2	Q7M6Z4
RefSeq (mRNA)	NM_001271927; NM_001271928; NM_017576; NM_001354069; NM_001354070 NM_001354071	NM_175214; NM_001360894
RefSeq (protein)	NP_001258856; NP_001258857; NP_060046; NP_001340998; NP_001340999 NP_001341000	NP_780423; NP_001347823
Location (UCSC)	Chr 9: 83.83 – 83.92 Mb	Chr 13: 58.44 – 58.51 Mb
PubMed search
- Wikidata
View/Edit Human	View/Edit Mouse

Kinesin family member 27 (KIF27), also known as kinesin-4, is a human protein encoded by the KIF27 gene. It is part of the kinesin family of motor proteins.
