= KIF19 =

Motor protein found in humans

Identifiers
- Aliases: KIF19, KIF19A, kinesin family member 19
- External IDs: MGI: 2447024; GeneCards: KIF19

Gene location (Human)
Chr.	Chromosome 17 (human)
Band	17q25.1	Start	74,326,210 bp
Band	17q25.1	End	74,355,820 bp

Gene location (Mouse)
Chr.	Chromosome 11 (mouse)
Band	11|11 E2	Start	114,656,214 bp
Band	11|11 E2	End	114,681,565 bp
RNA expression pattern
Bgee	Human / Mouse (ortholog); Top expressed in: right uterine tube; sural nerve; olfactory zone of nasal mucosa; spleen; granulocyte; C1 segment; hypothalamus; amygdala; caudate nucleus; putamen / Top expressed in: islet of Langerhans; spermatocyte; hypothalamus; testicle; lens; ovary; spermatid; embryo; morula; striatum of neuraxis; More reference expression data
BioGPS	n/a
Gene ontology
Molecular function	microtubule binding; microtubule motor activity; nucleotide binding; ATPase activity; plus-end-directed microtubule motor activity; ATP binding
Cellular component	cytoplasm; axoneme; cell projection; cilium; microtubule; cytoskeleton; kinesin complex
Biological process	microtubule-based movement; axonemal microtubule depolymerization; plus-end specific microtubule depolymerization
Sources:Amigo / QuickGO
Orthologs
Databases	NCBI: entry; OMA: entry
Species	Human	Mouse
Entrez	124602	286942
Ensembl	ENSG00000196169	ENSMUSG00000010021
UniProt	Q2TAC6	Q99PT9
RefSeq (mRNA)	NM_153209	NM_001102615
RefSeq (protein)	NP_694941	NP_001096085
Location (UCSC)	Chr 17: 74.33 – 74.36 Mb	Chr 11: 114.66 – 114.68 Mb
PubMed search
- Wikidata
View/Edit Human	View/Edit Mouse

Kinesin family member 19 (KIF19) is a protein in humans encoded by the KIF19 gene. It is part of the kinesin family of motor proteins.

== Function ==
KIF19 is involved in cancer metastasis, as well as cell-cell and cell-matrix interactions.
