= KIF26A =

Motor protein found in humans

Identifiers
- Aliases: KIF26A, kinesin family member 26A
- External IDs: OMIM: 613231; MGI: 2447072; GeneCards: KIF26A

Gene location (Human)
Chr.	Chromosome 14 (human)
Band	14q32.33	Start	104,138,587 bp
Band	14q32.33	End	104,180,894 bp

Gene location (Mouse)
Chr.	Chromosome 12 (mouse)
Band	12|12 F1	Start	112,112,642 bp
Band	12|12 F1	End	112,148,181 bp
RNA expression pattern
Bgee	Human / Mouse (ortholog); Top expressed in: ganglionic eminence; trabecular bone; tendon of biceps brachii; apex of heart; right ventricle; amniotic fluid; endothelial cell; gonad; mucosa of sigmoid colon; left ventricle / Top expressed in: Rostral migratory stream; hair follicle; molar; cumulus cell; aortic valve; condyle; ascending aorta; fossa; internal carotid artery; external carotid artery; More reference expression data
BioGPS	n/a
Gene ontology
Molecular function	microtubule binding; nucleotide binding; ATP binding; microtubule motor activity; ATPase activity
Cellular component	cytoplasm; cytosol; microtubule; cytoskeleton; kinesin complex
Biological process	enteric nervous system development; microtubule-based movement; regulation of cell growth by extracellular stimulus; negative regulation of signal transduction; antigen processing and presentation of exogenous peptide antigen via MHC class II; retrograde vesicle-mediated transport, Golgi to endoplasmic reticulum
Sources:Amigo / QuickGO
Orthologs
Databases	NCBI: entry; OMA: entry
Species	Human	Mouse
Entrez	26153	668303
Ensembl	ENSG00000066735	ENSMUSG00000021294
UniProt	Q9ULI4	Q52KG5
RefSeq (mRNA)	NM_015656	NM_001097621
RefSeq (protein)	NP_056471	NP_001091090
Location (UCSC)	Chr 14: 104.14 – 104.18 Mb	Chr 12: 112.11 – 112.15 Mb
PubMed search
- Wikidata
View/Edit Human	View/Edit Mouse

Kinesin family member 26A (KIF26A), also known as kinesin-11, is a human protein encoded by the KIF26A gene. It is part of the kinesin family of motor proteins.
