= KIF9 =

Motor protein found in humans

Identifiers
- Aliases: KIF9, kinesin family member 9
- External IDs: OMIM: 607910; MGI: 1098237; GeneCards: KIF9
Available structures
PDB	Ortholog search: PDBe RCSB
PDB	List of PDB id codes 3NWN

Gene location (Human)
Chr.	Chromosome 3 (human)
Band	3p21.31	Start	47,227,998 bp
Band	3p21.31	End	47,283,451 bp

Gene location (Mouse)
Chr.	Chromosome 9 (mouse)
Band	9|9 F2	Start	110,306,026 bp
Band	9|9 F2	End	110,354,247 bp
RNA expression pattern
Bgee	Human / Mouse (ortholog); Top expressed in: bronchial epithelial cell; sperm; caput epididymis; left testis; mucosa of paranasal sinus; right testis; right uterine tube; olfactory zone of nasal mucosa; tendon of biceps brachii; corpus epididymis / Top expressed in: spermatid; spermatocyte; seminiferous tubule; olfactory epithelium; choroid plexus of lateral ventricle; choroid plexus of fourth ventricle; Epithelium of choroid plexus; vestibular sensory epithelium; oocyte; primary oocyte; More reference expression data
BioGPS	n/a
Gene ontology
Molecular function	protein dimerization activity; nucleotide binding; microtubule motor activity; protein binding; microtubule binding; ATP binding; ATPase activity
Cellular component	cytoskeleton; vesicle; podosome; cytoplasm; kinesin complex; microtubule
Biological process	extracellular matrix disassembly; regulation of podosome assembly; organelle disassembly; microtubule-based movement
Sources:Amigo / QuickGO
Orthologs
Databases	NCBI: entry; OMA: entry
Species	Human	Mouse
Entrez	64147	16578
Ensembl	ENSG00000088727	ENSMUSG00000032489
UniProt	Q9HAQ2; Q6PJI1	Q9WV04
RefSeq (mRNA)	NM_001134878; NM_022342; NM_182902; NM_182903; NM_001377474 NM_001377475; NM_001377476; NM_001377477	NM_001163569; NM_010628
RefSeq (protein)	NP_001128350; NP_071737; NP_878905; NP_001364403; NP_001364404 NP_001364405; NP_001364406	NP_001157041; NP_034758
Location (UCSC)	Chr 3: 47.23 – 47.28 Mb	Chr 9: 110.31 – 110.35 Mb
PubMed search
- Wikidata
View/Edit Human	View/Edit Mouse

Kinesin family member 9 (KIF9), also known as kinesin-9, is a human protein encoded by the KIF9 gene. It is part of the kinesin family of motor proteins.

== Function ==
The beating of the flagella in sperm is regulated by KIF9 activity.
