= KIF3C =

Protein-coding gene in the species Homo sapiens

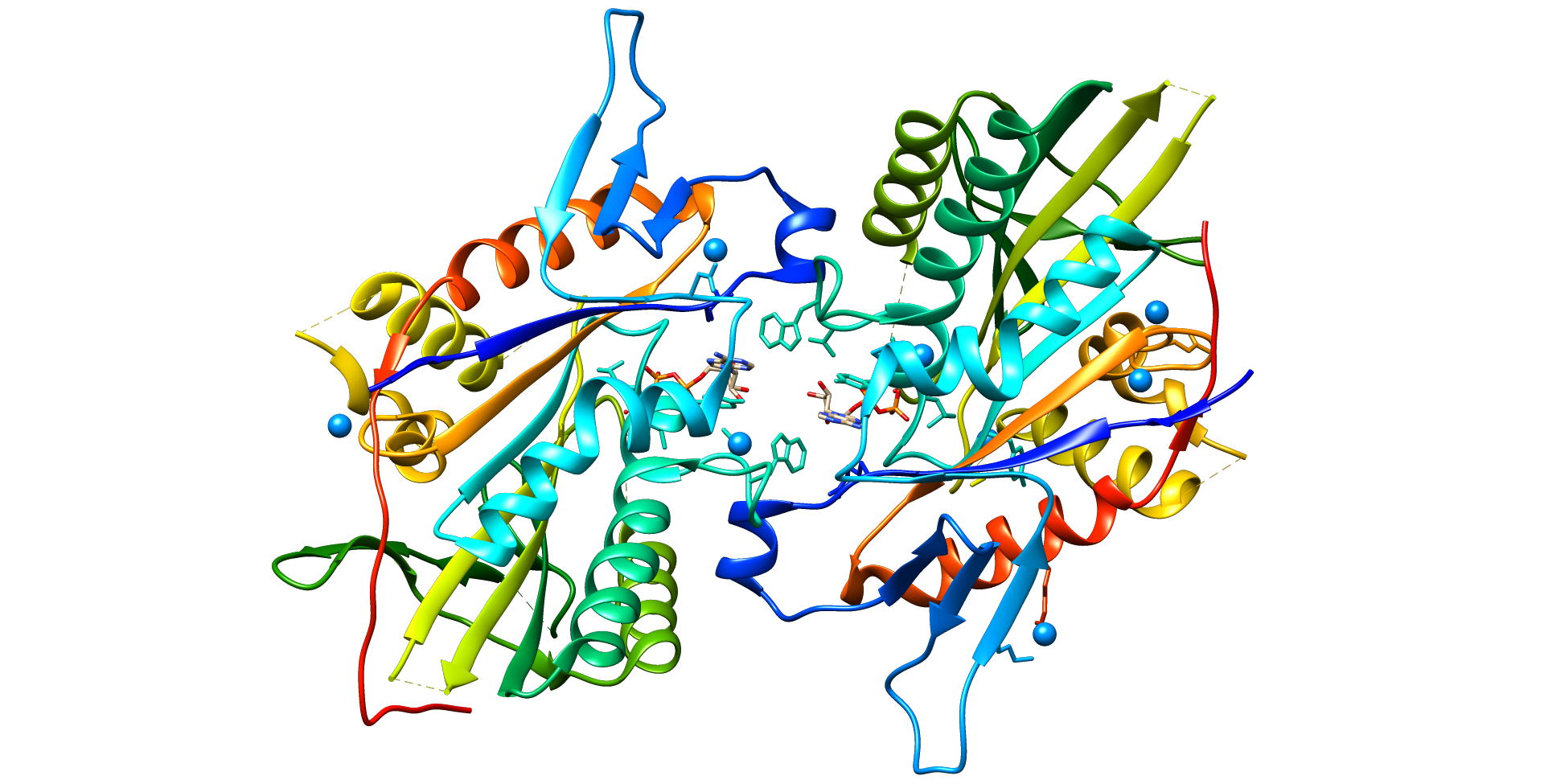

Identifiers
- Aliases: KIF3C, kinesin family member 3C
- External IDs: OMIM: 602845; MGI: 107979; GeneCards: KIF3C
Available structures
PDB	Ortholog search: PDBe RCSB
PDB	List of PDB id codes 3B6V

Gene location (Human)
Chr.	Chromosome 2 (human)
Band	2p23.3	Start	25,926,598 bp
Band	2p23.3	End	25,982,749 bp

Gene location (Mouse)
Chr.	Chromosome 12 (mouse)
Band	12 A1.1|12 1.77 cM	Start	3,415,132 bp
Band	12 A1.1|12 1.77 cM	End	3,456,494 bp
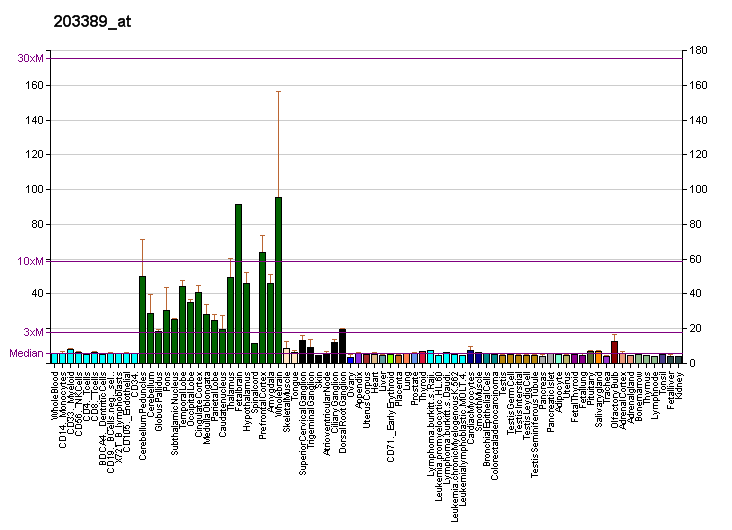

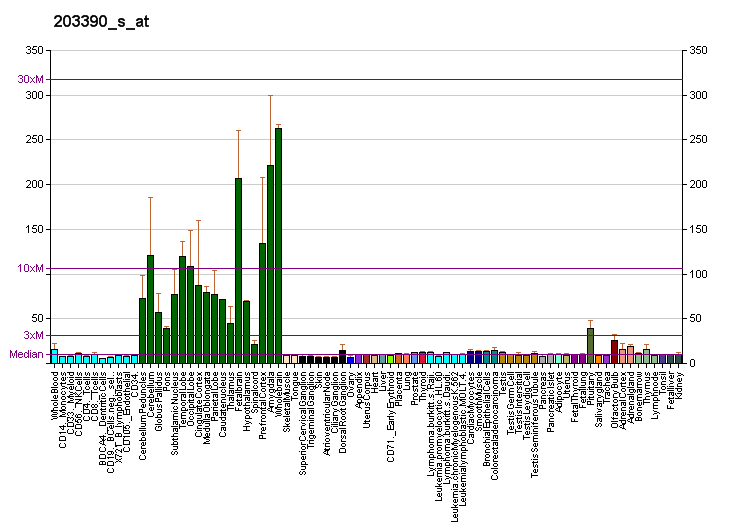
RNA expression pattern
Bgee	Human / Mouse (ortholog); Top expressed in: ganglionic eminence; Brodmann area 46; pons; prefrontal cortex; orbitofrontal cortex; frontal pole; right frontal lobe; superior frontal gyrus; dorsolateral prefrontal cortex; postcentral gyrus / Top expressed in: dentate gyrus of hippocampal formation granule cell; medial dorsal nucleus; superior frontal gyrus; dorsal tegmental nucleus; ventral tegmental area; medial geniculate nucleus; lateral geniculate nucleus; medial vestibular nucleus; pontine nuclei; cerebellar cortex; More reference expression data
BioGPS	More reference expression data
Gene ontology
Molecular function	microtubule binding; microtubule motor activity; nucleotide binding; ATPase activity; cytoskeletal motor activity; ATP binding
Cellular component	cytoplasm; cytosol; ciliary tip; microtubule; cytoskeleton; kinesin complex; cilium
Biological process	microtubule-based movement; antigen processing and presentation of exogenous peptide antigen via MHC class II; organelle transport along microtubule; retrograde vesicle-mediated transport, Golgi to endoplasmic reticulum; intraciliary transport involved in cilium assembly
Sources:Amigo / QuickGO
Orthologs
Databases	NCBI: entry; OMA: entry
Species	Human	Mouse
Entrez	3797	16570
Ensembl	ENSG00000084731	ENSMUSG00000020668
UniProt	O14782	O35066
RefSeq (mRNA)	NM_002254	NM_008445
RefSeq (protein)	NP_002245	NP_032471
Location (UCSC)	Chr 2: 25.93 – 25.98 Mb	Chr 12: 3.42 – 3.46 Mb
PubMed search
- Wikidata
View/Edit Human	View/Edit Mouse

Kinesin-like protein KIF3C is a protein that in humans is encoded by the KIF3C gene. It is part of the kinesin family of motor proteins.
