= KIF25 =

Motor protein found in humans

Identifiers
- Aliases: KIF25, KNSL3, kinesin family member 25
- External IDs: OMIM: 603815; GeneCards: KIF25

Gene location (Human)
Chr.	Chromosome 6 (human)
Band	6q27	Start	167,996,241 bp
Band	6q27	End	168,045,091 bp
RNA expression pattern
Bgee	Human / Mouse (ortholog); Top expressed in: gonad; buccal mucosa cell; testicle; right hemisphere of cerebellum; apex of heart; C1 segment; abdominal fat; right frontal lobe; putamen; dorsolateral prefrontal cortex / n/a; More reference expression data
BioGPS	n/a
Gene ontology
Molecular function	microtubule binding; microtubule motor activity; nucleotide binding; ATPase activity; ATP binding; minus-end-directed microtubule motor activity
Cellular component	cytoplasm; microtubule; cytoskeleton; kinesin complex; centrosome; microtubule organizing center
Biological process	microtubule-based movement; negative regulation of autophagy; organelle organization; mitotic sister chromatid segregation; negative regulation of mitotic centrosome separation; protein homotetramerization; establishment of spindle orientation; nucleus localization
Sources:Amigo / QuickGO
Orthologs
Databases	NCBI: entry; OMA: entry
Species	Human	Mouse
Entrez	3834	n/a
Ensembl	ENSG00000125337	n/a
UniProt	Q9UIL4	n/a
RefSeq (mRNA)	NM_005355; NM_030615	n/a
RefSeq (protein)	NP_005346; NP_085118	n/a
Location (UCSC)	Chr 6: 168 – 168.05 Mb	n/a
PubMed search		n/a
- Wikidata
View/Edit Human

Kinesin family member 25 (KIF25), also known as kinesin-14, is a human protein encoded by the KIF25 gene. It is part of the kinesin family of motor proteins.

== Function ==
KIF25 is a minus-end directed microtubule motor protein, and its activity delays the separation of chromosomes during mitosis.
