= KIF17 =

Protein-coding gene in humans

Identifiers
- Aliases: KIF17, Kif17, 5930435E01Rik, AW492270, Kif17b, mKIAA1405, KIF3X, KLP-2, OSM-3, kinesin family member 17
- External IDs: OMIM: 605037; MGI: 1098229; GeneCards: KIF17

Gene location (Human)
Chr.	Chromosome 1 (human)
Band	1p36.12	Start	20,664,014 bp
Band	1p36.12	End	20,718,017 bp

Gene location (Mouse)
Chr.	Chromosome 4 (mouse)
Band	4|4 D3	Start	137,977,746 bp
Band	4|4 D3	End	138,029,278 bp
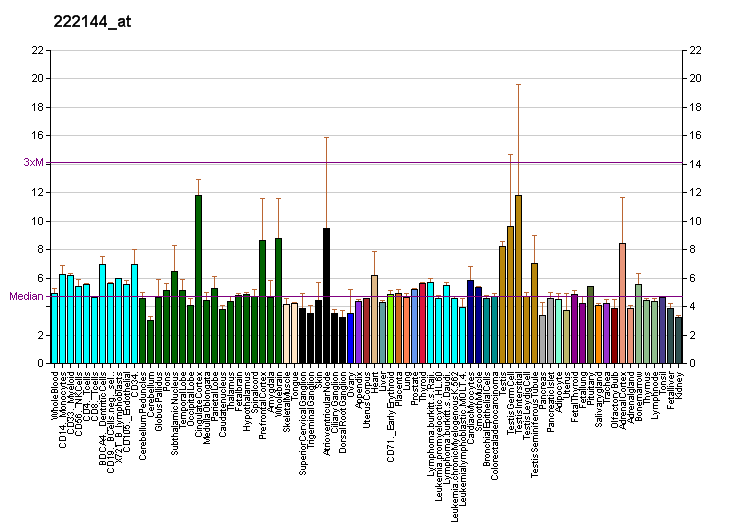
RNA expression pattern
Bgee	Human / Mouse (ortholog); Top expressed in: left testis; right testis; right adrenal cortex; left adrenal gland; spleen; left adrenal cortex; right frontal lobe; prefrontal cortex; testicle; apex of heart / Top expressed in: primary oocyte; zygote; seminiferous tubule; secondary oocyte; spermatid; superior frontal gyrus; visual cortex; primary visual cortex; lumbar subsegment of spinal cord; dorsal striatum; More reference expression data
BioGPS	More reference expression data
Gene ontology
Molecular function	nucleotide binding; microtubule motor activity; microtubule binding; plus-end-directed microtubule motor activity; ATP binding; ATPase activity
Cellular component	intraciliary transport particle B; cytoplasm; ciliary basal body; cytosol; kinesin complex; microtubule cytoskeleton; photoreceptor connecting cilium; periciliary membrane compartment; axoneme; microtubule; cytoskeleton; cell projection; cilium; dendrite cytoplasm; neuron projection
Biological process	microtubule-based movement; cell projection organization; microtubule-based process; protein transport; protein-containing complex localization; vesicle-mediated transport; neurogenesis; intraciliary transport involved in cilium assembly; anterograde dendritic transport of neurotransmitter receptor complex
Sources:Amigo / QuickGO
Orthologs
Databases	NCBI: entry; OMA: entry
Species	Human	Mouse
Entrez	57576	16559
Ensembl	ENSG00000117245	ENSMUSG00000028758
UniProt	Q9P2E2	Q99PW8
RefSeq (mRNA)	NM_001122819; NM_001287212; NM_020816	NM_001190978; NM_010623
RefSeq (protein)	NP_001116291; NP_001274141; NP_065867	NP_001177907; NP_034753
Location (UCSC)	Chr 1: 20.66 – 20.72 Mb	Chr 4: 137.98 – 138.03 Mb
PubMed search
- Wikidata
View/Edit Human	View/Edit Mouse

Kinesin-like protein KIF17 is a protein that in humans is encoded by the KIF17 gene. KIF17 and its close relative, C. elegans OSM-3, are members of the kinesin-2 family of plus-end directed microtubule-based motor proteins. In contrast to heterotrimeric kinesin-2 motors, however, KIF17 and OSM-3 form distinct homodimeric complexes. Homodimeric kinesin-2 has been implicated in the transport of NMDA receptors along dendrites for delivery to the dendritic membrane, whereas both heterotrimeric and homodimeric kinesin-2 motors function cooperatively in anterograde intraflagellar transport (IFT) and cilium biogenesis.
