= KIF12 =

Motor protein found in humans

Identifiers
- Aliases: KIF12, kinesin family member 12
- External IDs: OMIM: 611278; MGI: 1098232; GeneCards: KIF12

Gene location (Human)
Chr.	Chromosome 9 (human)
Band	9q32	Start	114,086,126 bp
Band	9q32	End	114,099,291 bp

Gene location (Mouse)
Chr.	Chromosome 4 (mouse)
Band	4|4 B3	Start	63,083,867 bp
Band	4|4 B3	End	63,090,368 bp
RNA expression pattern
Bgee	Human / Mouse (ortholog); Top expressed in: body of pancreas; gallbladder; right lobe of liver; right uterine tube; left lobe of thyroid gland; right lobe of thyroid gland; human kidney; mucosa of transverse colon; testicle; renal medulla / Top expressed in: right kidney; proximal tubule; islet of Langerhans; human kidney; epithelium of small intestine; medullary collecting duct; efferent ductule; embryo; yolk sac; lumbar spinal ganglion; More reference expression data
BioGPS	n/a
Gene ontology
Molecular function	microtubule binding; microtubule motor activity; nucleotide binding; ATPase activity; ATP binding; molecular function
Cellular component	cytoplasm; microtubule; extracellular exosome; cytoskeleton; kinesin complex
Biological process	microtubule-based movement; biological process
Sources:Amigo / QuickGO
Orthologs
Databases	NCBI: entry; OMA: entry
Species	Human	Mouse
Entrez	113220	16552
Ensembl	ENSG00000136883	ENSMUSG00000028357
UniProt	Q96FN5	Q9D2Z8
RefSeq (mRNA)	NM_138424	NM_010616; NM_001317352
RefSeq (protein)	NP_612433	NP_001304281; NP_034746
Location (UCSC)	Chr 9: 114.09 – 114.1 Mb	Chr 4: 63.08 – 63.09 Mb
PubMed search
- Wikidata
View/Edit Human	View/Edit Mouse

Kinesin family member 12 (KIF12), also known as kinesin-12, is a human protein encoded by the gene KIF12. It is part of the kinesin family of motor proteins.

== Clinical significance ==
Mutations in KIF12 are associated with cholestatic liver disease.
