= KIF21B =

Motor protein found in humans

Identifiers
- Aliases: KIF21B, kinesin family member 21B
- External IDs: OMIM: 608322; MGI: 109234; GeneCards: KIF21B

Gene location (Human)
Chr.	Chromosome 1 (human)
Band	1q32.1	Start	200,969,390 bp
Band	1q32.1	End	201,023,714 bp

Gene location (Mouse)
Chr.	Chromosome 1 (mouse)
Band	1 E4|1 59.61 cM	Start	136,059,127 bp
Band	1 E4|1 59.61 cM	End	136,105,736 bp
RNA expression pattern
Bgee	Human / Mouse (ortholog); Top expressed in: ganglionic eminence; Brodmann area 10; Brodmann area 46; granulocyte; blood; retinal pigment epithelium; entorhinal cortex; Region I of hippocampus proper; orbitofrontal cortex; frontal pole / Top expressed in: granulocyte; ganglionic eminence; neural layer of retina; mesenteric lymph nodes; thymus; blood; visual cortex; spleen; primary visual cortex; Rostral migratory stream; More reference expression data
BioGPS	n/a
Gene ontology
Molecular function	microtubule binding; microtubule motor activity; nucleotide binding; ATPase activity; ATP binding
Cellular component	cytoplasm; microtubule; cytoskeleton; kinesin complex; axon; dendrite; growth cone; cytoplasmic vesicle; cell projection
Biological process	microtubule-based movement
Sources:Amigo / QuickGO
Orthologs
Databases	NCBI: entry; OMA: entry
Species	Human	Mouse
Entrez	23046	16565
Ensembl	ENSG00000116852	ENSMUSG00000041642
UniProt	O75037	Q9QXL1
RefSeq (mRNA)	NM_001252100; NM_001252102; NM_001252103; NM_017596	NM_001039472; NM_019962; NM_177126
RefSeq (protein)	NP_001239029; NP_001239031; NP_001239032; NP_060066	NP_001034561
Location (UCSC)	Chr 1: 200.97 – 201.02 Mb	Chr 1: 136.06 – 136.11 Mb
PubMed search
- Wikidata
View/Edit Human	View/Edit Mouse

Kinesin family member 21B (KIF21B), also known as kinesin-4, is a human protein encoded by the KIF21B gene. It is part of the kinesin family of motor proteins.
