= KRP =

KRP may refer to:

- Home Political Representation (Polish: Krajowa Reprezentacja Polityczna, KRP) a WWII Polish organization
- The IATA code for Midtjyllands Airport
- Kinesin related proteins
- National Bureau of Investigation (Finland) (Finnish: Keskusrikospoliisi, KRP)
