= KIF5C =

Protein-coding gene in the species Homo sapiens

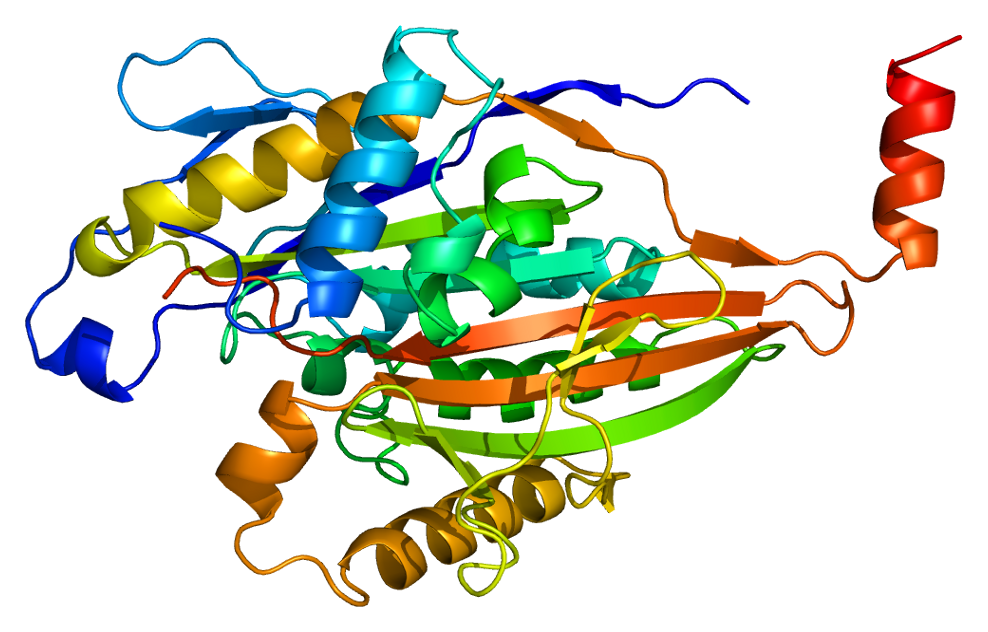

Identifiers
- Aliases: KIF5C, CDCBM2, KINN, NKHC, NKHC-2, NKHC2, kinesin family member 5C
- External IDs: OMIM: 604593; MGI: 1098269; GeneCards: KIF5C
Available structures
PDB	Ortholog search: PDBe RCSB
PDB	List of PDB id codes 1VFV, 1VFW, 1VFX, 1VFZ, 3J6H, 3WRD, 3X2T

Gene location (Human)
Chr.	Chromosome 2 (human)
Band	2q23.1-q23.2	Start	148,875,227 bp
Band	2q23.1-q23.2	End	149,026,759 bp

Gene location (Mouse)
Chr.	Chromosome 2 (mouse)
Band	2 C1.1|2 28.68 cM	Start	49,509,310 bp
Band	2 C1.1|2 28.68 cM	End	49,664,790 bp
RNA expression pattern
Bgee	Human / Mouse (ortholog); Top expressed in: Brodmann area 10; paraflocculus of cerebellum; frontal pole; cerebellar vermis; middle temporal gyrus; middle frontal gyrus; Brodmann area 46; postcentral gyrus; Brodmann area 23; orbitofrontal cortex / Top expressed in: globus pallidus; substantia nigra; cerebellar vermis; lobe of cerebellum; lateral geniculate nucleus; dentate gyrus of hippocampal formation granule cell; facial motor nucleus; ventral tegmental area; anterior amygdaloid area; subiculum; More reference expression data
BioGPS	n/a
Gene ontology
Molecular function	microtubule motor activity; nucleotide binding; microtubule binding; protein binding; plus-end-directed microtubule motor activity; ATP binding; ATPase activity
Cellular component	cytoplasm; kinesin complex; ciliary rootlet; neuron projection; microtubule; cytoskeleton; dendrite; dendrite cytoplasm; cell projection; soma; axonal growth cone; synapse; distal axon; axon cytoplasm
Biological process	protein localization; cytoskeleton-dependent intracellular transport; mRNA transport; organelle organization; axon guidance; microtubule-based movement; motor neuron axon guidance; synaptic vesicle transport; anterograde dendritic transport of neurotransmitter receptor complex; anterograde axonal protein transport
Sources:Amigo / QuickGO
Orthologs
Databases	NCBI: entry; OMA: entry
Species	Human	Mouse
Entrez	3800	16574
Ensembl	ENSG00000168280; ENSG00000276734	ENSMUSG00000026764
UniProt	O60282	P28738
RefSeq (mRNA)	NM_004522	NM_008449
RefSeq (protein)	NP_004513	NP_032475
Location (UCSC)	Chr 2: 148.88 – 149.03 Mb	Chr 2: 49.51 – 49.66 Mb
PubMed search
- Wikidata
View/Edit Human	View/Edit Mouse

Kinesin heavy chain isoform 5C is a protein that in humans is encoded by the KIF5C gene. It is part of the kinesin family of motor proteins.
