= KIF16B =

Protein-coding gene in the species Homo sapiens

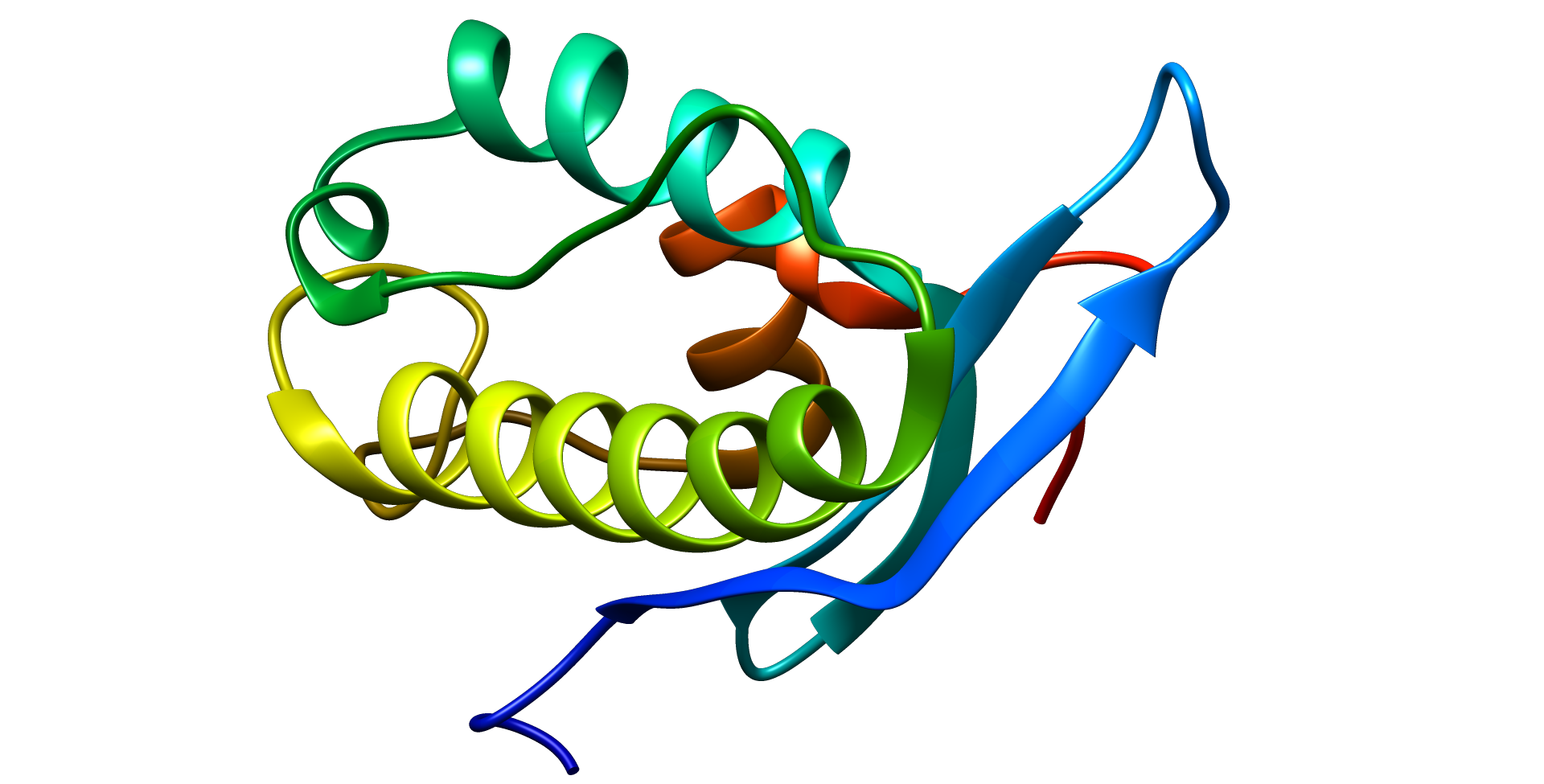

Identifiers
- Aliases: KIF16B, C20orf23, KISC20ORF, SNX23, kinesin family member 16B
- External IDs: OMIM: 618171; MGI: 1098240; GeneCards: KIF16B
Available structures
PDB	Ortholog search: PDBe RCSB
PDB	List of PDB id codes 2V14

Gene location (Human)
Chr.	Chromosome 20 (human)
Band	20p12.1	Start	16,272,104 bp
Band	20p12.1	End	16,573,448 bp

Gene location (Mouse)
Chr.	Chromosome 2 (mouse)
Band	2|2 G1	Start	142,617,474 bp
Band	2|2 G1	End	142,901,531 bp
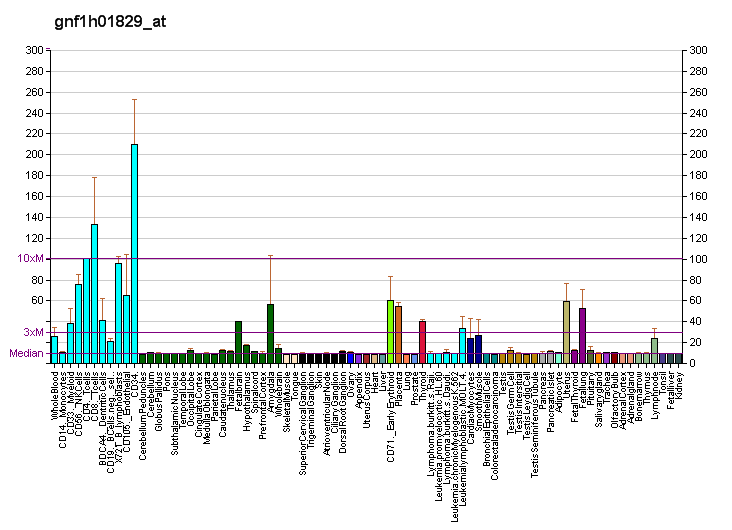

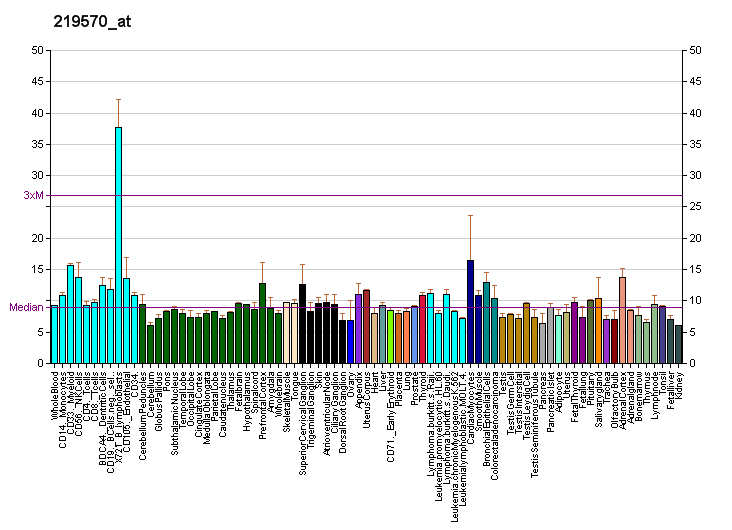
RNA expression pattern
Bgee	Human / Mouse (ortholog); Top expressed in: sural nerve; jejunal mucosa; mucosa of colon; mucosa of sigmoid colon; Achilles tendon; mucosa of transverse colon; rectum; left adrenal gland; left adrenal cortex; right adrenal cortex / Top expressed in: submandibular gland; seminal vesicula; parotid gland; sternocleidomastoid muscle; stria vascularis; intercostal muscle; vastus lateralis muscle; digastric muscle; triceps brachii muscle; lacrimal gland; More reference expression data
BioGPS	More reference expression data
Gene ontology
Molecular function	nucleotide binding; microtubule motor activity; phosphatidylinositol-3-phosphate binding; microtubule binding; phosphatidylinositol-3,5-bisphosphate binding; phosphatidylinositol-3,4-bisphosphate binding; phosphatidylinositol binding; plus-end-directed microtubule motor activity; ATP binding; phosphatidylinositol-3,4,5-trisphosphate binding; lipid binding; ATPase activity
Cellular component	cytoplasm; endosome; early endosome membrane; membrane; kinesin complex; early endosome; microtubule; cytoskeleton; cytosol; phagocytic vesicle
Biological process	endoderm development; epidermal growth factor receptor signaling pathway; Golgi to endosome transport; receptor catabolic process; fibroblast growth factor receptor signaling pathway; microtubule-based movement; early endosome to late endosome transport; formation of primary germ layer; regulation of receptor recycling; cellular response to interferon-gamma
Sources:Amigo / QuickGO
Orthologs
Databases	NCBI: entry; OMA: entry
Species	Human	Mouse
Entrez	55614	16558
Ensembl	ENSG00000089177	ENSMUSG00000038844
UniProt	Q96L93	B1AVY7
RefSeq (mRNA)	NM_001199865; NM_001199866; NM_024704	NM_001081133; NM_001355123
RefSeq (protein)	NP_001186794; NP_001186795; NP_078980	NP_001074602; NP_001342052
Location (UCSC)	Chr 20: 16.27 – 16.57 Mb	Chr 2: 142.62 – 142.9 Mb
PubMed search
- Wikidata
View/Edit Human	View/Edit Mouse

Kinesin family member 16B, also known as KIF16B, is a protein which in humans is encoded by the KIF16B gene.

== See also ==
- Kinesin
