= KIFC1 =

Protein-coding gene in the species Homo sapiens

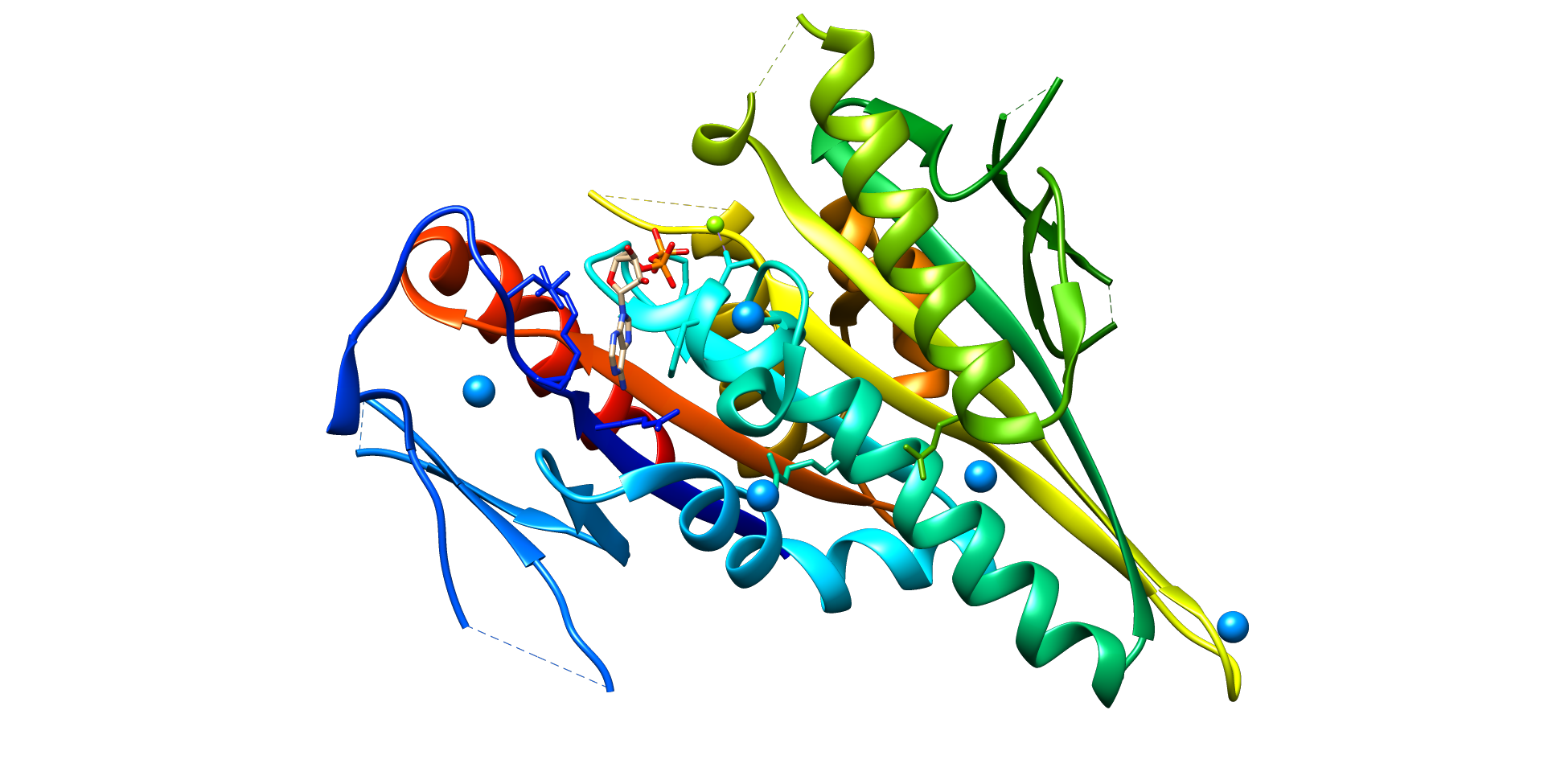

Identifiers
- Aliases: KIFC1, HSET, KNSL2, kinesin family member C1
- External IDs: OMIM: 603763; MGI: 2137414; GeneCards: KIFC1
Available structures
PDB	Ortholog search: PDBe RCSB
PDB	List of PDB id codes 2REP

Gene location (Human)
Chr.	Chromosome 6 (human)
Band	6p21.32	Start	33,391,823 bp
Band	6p21.32	End	33,409,896 bp

Gene location (Mouse)
Chr.	Chromosome 17 (mouse)
Band	17|17 A3.3	Start	27,136,065 bp
Band	17|17 A3.3	End	27,151,557 bp
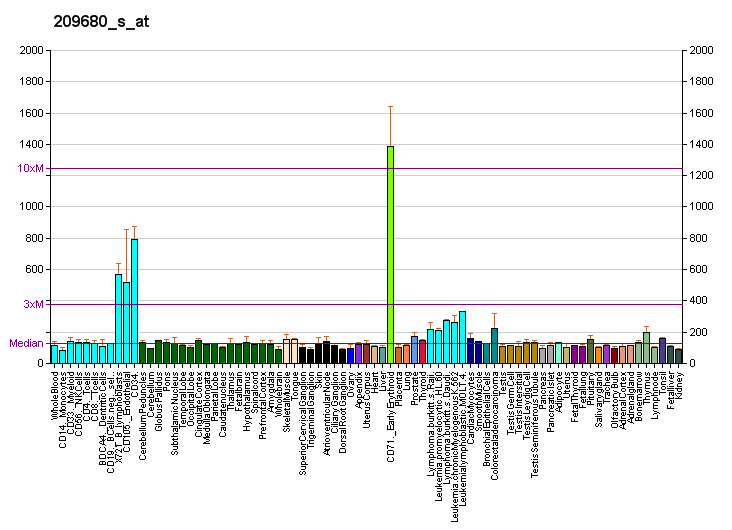
RNA expression pattern
Bgee	Human / Mouse (ortholog); Top expressed in: ventricular zone; ganglionic eminence; gonad; bone marrow; mucosa of transverse colon; lymph node; appendix; stromal cell of endometrium; bone marrow cell; right testis / Top expressed in: bone marrow; yolk sac; epiblast; urethra; ventricular zone; thymus; hair; granulocyte; placenta; tail of embryo; More reference expression data
BioGPS	More reference expression data
Gene ontology
Molecular function	nucleotide binding; microtubule binding; ATPase activity; ATP binding; microtubule motor activity; minus-end-directed microtubule motor activity
Cellular component	cytoplasm; endosome; membrane; kinesin complex; spindle; microtubule organizing center; early endosome; microtubule; cytoskeleton; nucleus; mitotic spindle
Biological process	cell division; mitotic spindle assembly; spermatogenesis; mitotic sister chromatid segregation; cell cycle; mitotic metaphase plate congression; microtubule-based movement
Sources:Amigo / QuickGO
Orthologs
Databases	NCBI: entry; OMA: entry
Species	Human	Mouse
Entrez	3833	16580
Ensembl	ENSG00000233450; ENSG00000204197; ENSG00000237649; ENSG00000056678	ENSMUSG00000024301
UniProt	Q9BW19	Q9QWT9
RefSeq (mRNA)	NM_002263	NM_016761; NM_053173
RefSeq (protein)	NP_002254	NP_001182227
Location (UCSC)	Chr 6: 33.39 – 33.41 Mb	Chr 17: 27.14 – 27.15 Mb
PubMed search
- Wikidata
View/Edit Human	View/Edit Mouse

Kinesin-like protein KIFC1 is a protein that in humans is encoded by the KIFC1 gene.

== Function ==
The protein KifC1 is a member of the kinesin-14 family. KifC1 consists of a C-terminal motor domain, superhelical stalk, and N-terminal tail domain. Tail and motor domains contain microtubule-binding sites. This kinesin moves toward the minus-end of the microtubule and has the ability to slide or crosslink microtubules. KifC1 functions during mitotic spindle formation.
