= Transport by multiple-motor proteins =

Transport by molecular motor proteins (Kinesin, Dynein and unconventional Myosin) is essential for cell functioning and survival. Studies of multiple motors are inspired by the fact that multiple motors are involved in many biological processes such as intra-cellular transport and mitosis. This increasing interest in modeling multiple motor transport is particularly due to improved understanding of single motor function. Several models have been proposed in recent year to understand the transport by multiple motors.

Models developed can be broadly divided into two categories (1) mean-field/steady state model and (2) stochastic model. The mean-field model is useful for describing transport by a large group of motors. In mean-field description, fluctuation in the forces that individual motors feel while pulling the cargo is ignored. In stochastic model, fluctuation in the forces that motors feel are not ignored. Steady-state/mean-field model is useful for modeling transport by a large group of motors whereas stochastic model is useful for modeling transport by few motors.

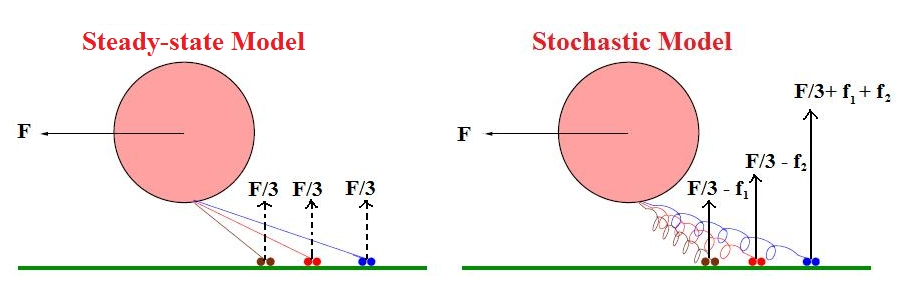
Models of multiple-motor-based transport. Steady-state/mean-field model (left); stochastic model (right)
