= KIF18A =

Protein-coding gene in the species Homo sapiens

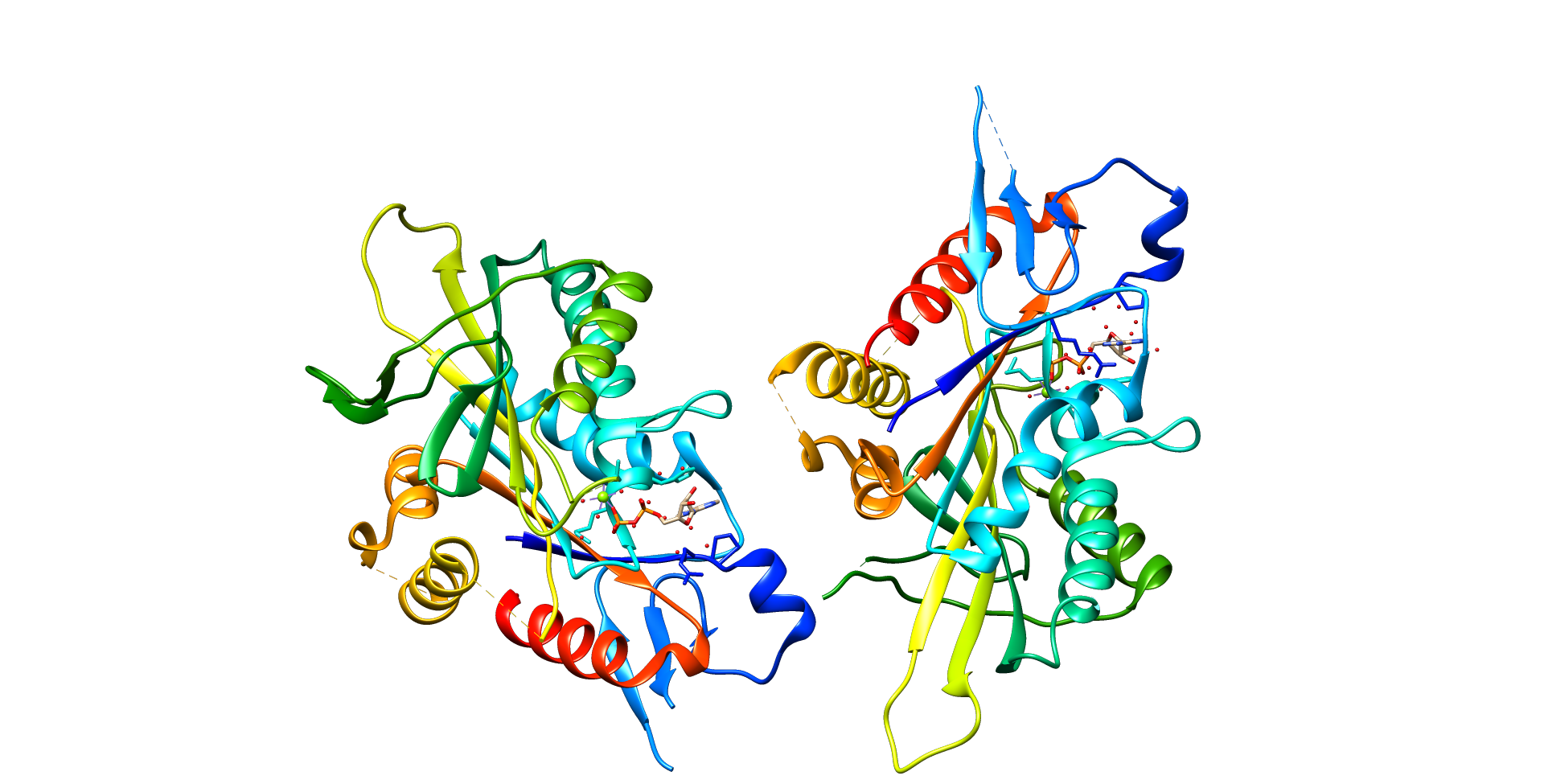

Identifiers
- Aliases: KIF18A, MS-PPP1R99, kinesin family member 18A
- External IDs: OMIM: 611271; MGI: 2446977; GeneCards: KIF18A
Available structures
| PDB | Ortholog search: PDBe RCSB |
| PDB | List of PDB id codes 3LRE |

Gene location (Human)
| Chr. | Chromosome 11 (human) |
| Band | 11p14.1 | Start | 28,020,619 bp |
| Band | 11p14.1 | End | 28,108,156 bp |

Gene location (Mouse)
| Chr. | Chromosome 2 (mouse) |
| Band | 2|2 E3 | Start | 109,111,083 bp |
| Band | 2|2 E3 | End | 109,172,092 bp |
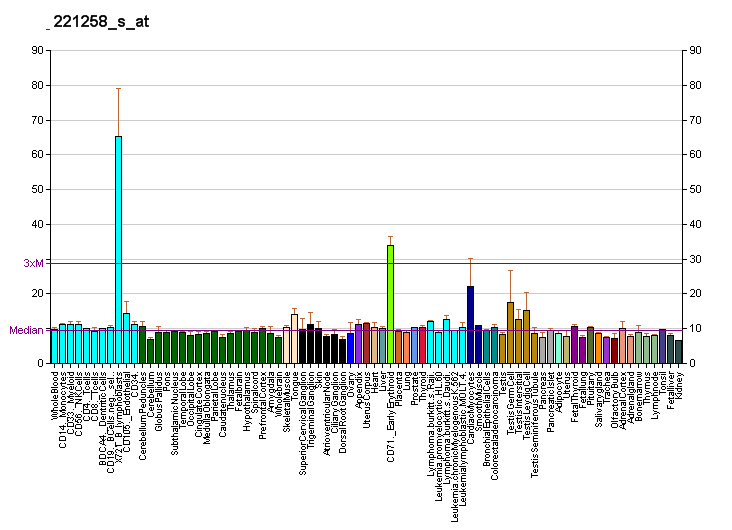
RNA expression pattern
| Bgee | Human / Mouse (ortholog); Top expressed in: ventricular zone; gonad; testicle; secondary oocyte; ganglionic eminence; sperm; left testis; right testis; stromal cell of endometrium; bone marrow / Top expressed in: zygote; secondary oocyte; primary oocyte; spermatid; fetal liver hematopoietic progenitor cell; ventricular zone; genital tubercle; spermatocyte; epiblast; tail of embryo; More reference expression data |
| BioGPS | More reference expression data |
Gene ontology
| Molecular function | nucleotide binding; microtubule motor activity; tubulin-dependent ATPase activity; microtubule binding; microtubule plus-end binding; protein binding; actin binding; plus-end-directed microtubule motor activity; ATP binding; ATPase activity |
| Cellular component | cytoplasm; cytosol; cell projection; kinetochore microtubule; kinesin complex; ruffle; microtubule cytoskeleton; microtubule organizing center; mitotic spindle midzone; caveola; microtubule; cytoskeleton; nucleus; kinetochore; mitotic spindle astral microtubule |
| Biological process | antigen processing and presentation of exogenous peptide antigen via MHC class II; male meiotic nuclear division; regulation of microtubule cytoskeleton organization; microtubule-based movement; seminiferous tubule development; protein transport; microtubule depolymerization; mitotic metaphase plate congression; retrograde vesicle-mediated transport, Golgi to endoplasmic reticulum; cellular response to estradiol stimulus; mitotic sister chromatid segregation |
Sources:Amigo / QuickGO
Orthologs
| Databases | NCBI: entry; OMA: entry |
| Species | Human | Mouse |
| Entrez | 81930 | 228421 |
| Ensembl | ENSG00000121621 | ENSMUSG00000027115 |
| UniProt | Q8NI77 | Q91WD7 |
| RefSeq (mRNA) | NM_031217 | NM_139303 |
| RefSeq (protein) | NP_112494 | NP_647464 |
| Location (UCSC) | Chr 11: 28.02 – 28.11 Mb | Chr 2: 109.11 – 109.17 Mb |
| PubMed search |
- Wikidata
| View/Edit Human | View/Edit Mouse |

Kinesin family member KIF18A is a human protein encoded by the KIF18A gene. It is part of the kinesin family of motor proteins.

== Function ==
KIF18A is a plus-end directed motor protein, and migrates to the plus ends of the spindle during early mitosis. It first accumulates there during prophase and metaphase, and is depleted during anaphase.

KIF18a(-/-) knockout in mice results in complete sterility in males, but not females, due to abnormal development of the seminiferous tubules. The mice were otherwise normal, suggesting KIF18a is not essential for cell divisions in non-germ cells.

== Therapeutic Target ==
KIF18A has been considered as a cancer target because it is overexpressed in many cancer types and mouse studies suggest it is dispensable in somatic cells. As such, small molecule inhibitors of KIF18A have been developed to block its activity.
