= KIF4A =

Protein-coding gene in the species Homo sapiens

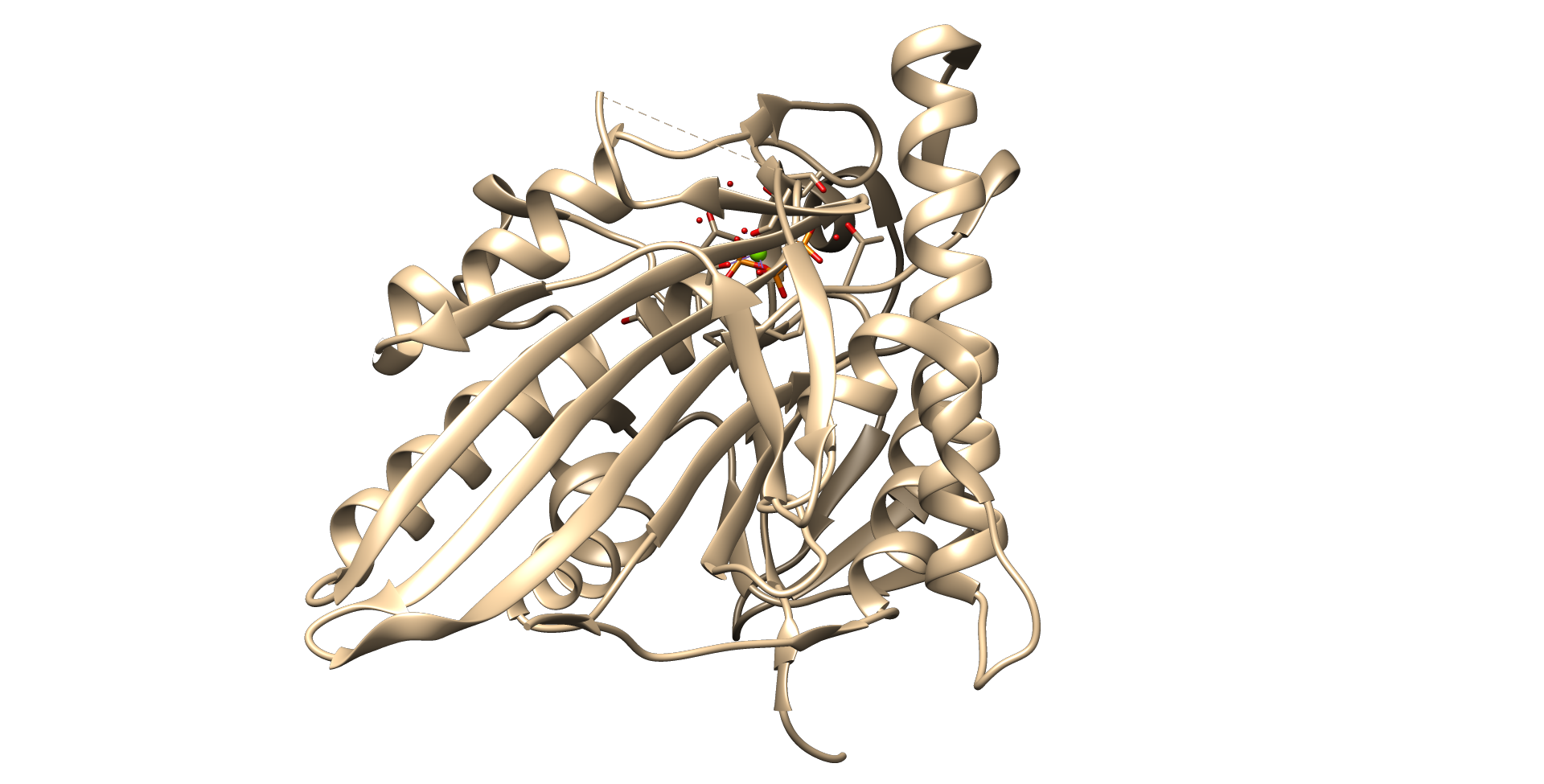

Identifiers
- Aliases: KIF4A, KIF4, KIF4G1, MRX100, kinesin family member 4A, XLID100
- External IDs: OMIM: 300521; MGI: 108389; GeneCards: KIF4A
Available structures
PDB	Ortholog search: PDBe RCSB
PDB	List of PDB id codes 3ZFC, 6OYL, 3ZFD

Gene location (Human)
Chr.	X chromosome (human)
Band	Xq13.1	Start	70,290,104 bp
Band	Xq13.1	End	70,420,886 bp

Gene location (Mouse)
Chr.	X chromosome (mouse)
Band	X C3|X 43.72 cM	Start	99,669,343 bp
Band	X C3|X 43.72 cM	End	99,770,820 bp
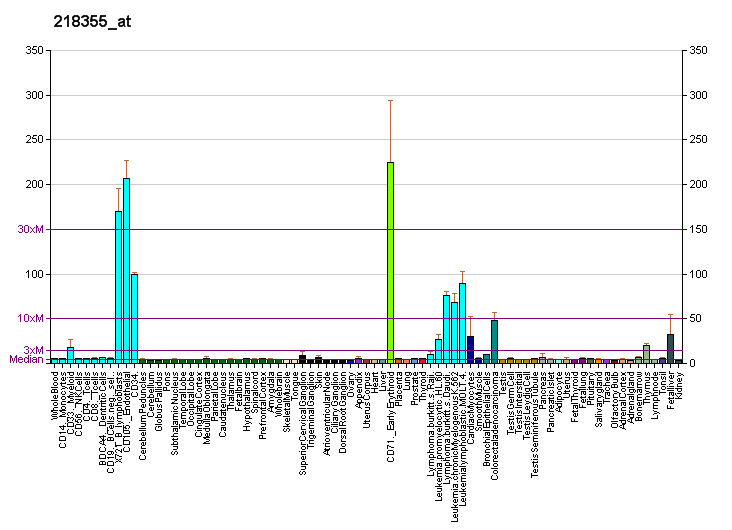
RNA expression pattern
Bgee	Human / Mouse (ortholog); Top expressed in: oocyte; secondary oocyte; ventricular zone; ganglionic eminence; gonad; testicle; bone marrow; trabecular bone; stromal cell of endometrium; mucosa of transverse colon / Top expressed in: zygote; primary oocyte; otic placode; genital tubercle; otic vesicle; secondary oocyte; tail of embryo; saccule; ventricular zone; fetal liver hematopoietic progenitor cell; More reference expression data
BioGPS	More reference expression data
Gene ontology
Molecular function	DNA binding; microtubule motor activity; nucleotide binding; microtubule binding; protein binding; ATP binding; plus-end-directed microtubule motor activity; ATPase activity
Cellular component	cytosol; membrane; kinesin complex; nuclear matrix; spindle; nucleoplasm; chromosome; spindle microtubule; microtubule; cytoskeleton; nucleus; axon cytoplasm; midbody; cytoplasm; intercellular bridge
Biological process	antigen processing and presentation of exogenous peptide antigen via MHC class II; mitotic spindle midzone assembly; mitotic cytokinesis; organelle organization; anterograde axonal transport; retrograde vesicle-mediated transport, Golgi to endoplasmic reticulum; microtubule-based movement; mitotic spindle organization
Sources:Amigo / QuickGO
Orthologs
Databases	NCBI: entry; OMA: entry
Species	Human	Mouse
Entrez	24137	16571
Ensembl	ENSG00000090889	ENSMUSG00000034311
UniProt	O95239	P33174
RefSeq (mRNA)	NM_012310	NM_008446
RefSeq (protein)	NP_036442	NP_032472
Location (UCSC)	Chr X: 70.29 – 70.42 Mb	Chr X: 99.67 – 99.77 Mb
PubMed search
- Wikidata
View/Edit Human	View/Edit Mouse

Kinesin family member 4A is a protein that in humans is encoded by the KIF4A gene.

== Function ==
Kinesins, such as KIF4A, are microtubule-based motor proteins that generate directional movement along microtubules. They are involved in many crucial cellular processes, including cell division.

== Interactions ==
KIF4A has been shown to interact with HMG20B and DNMT3B.

== Clinical significance ==
NTCP is the entry receptor for both Hepatitis B (HBV) and Hepatitis D viruses (HDV). KIF4 was found to play an essential role in HBV and HDV infection through its regulation of the retrograde transport of NTCP from the cytoplasm to the cell surface where it acts as a receptor for HBV/HDV infection.
