= KIFC3 =

Protein-coding gene in the species Homo sapiens

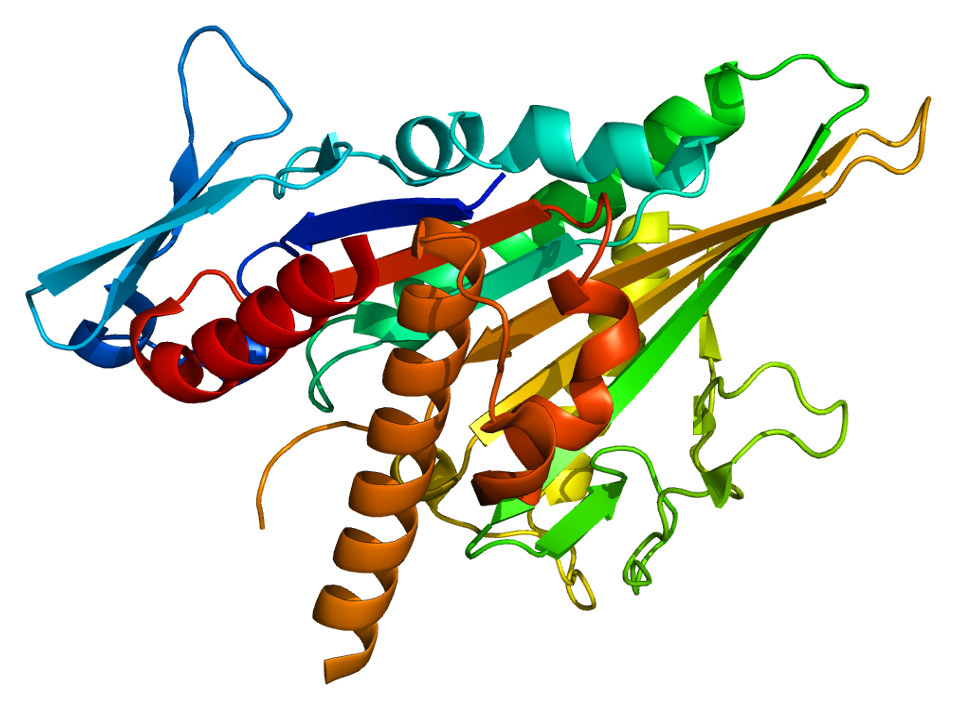

Identifiers
- Aliases: KIFC3, kinesin family member C3
- External IDs: OMIM: 604535; MGI: 109202; GeneCards: KIFC3
Available structures
PDB	Ortholog search: PDBe RCSB
PDB	List of PDB id codes 2H58

Gene location (Human)
Chr.	Chromosome 16 (human)
Band	16q21	Start	57,758,217 bp
Band	16q21	End	57,863,053 bp

Gene location (Mouse)
Chr.	Chromosome 8 (mouse)
Band	8 C5|8 47.12 cM	Start	95,826,456 bp
Band	8 C5|8 47.12 cM	End	95,929,440 bp
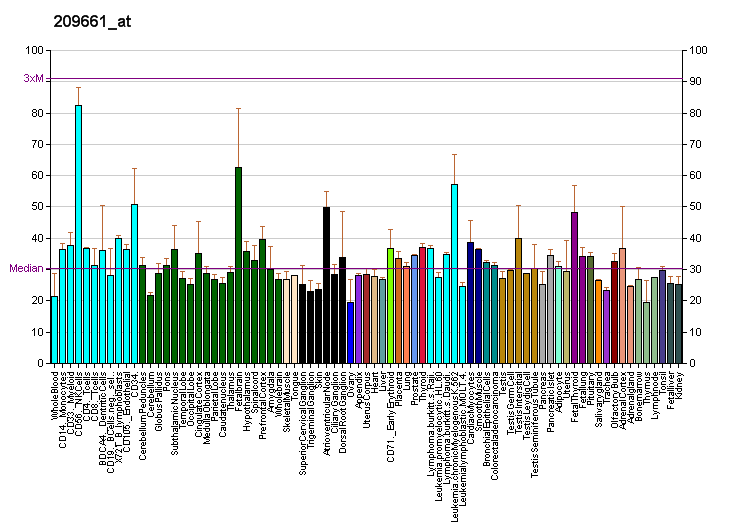
RNA expression pattern
Bgee	Human / Mouse (ortholog); Top expressed in: right lobe of thyroid gland; left lobe of thyroid gland; sural nerve; body of pancreas; right testis; left testis; skin of leg; apex of heart; right lobe of liver; upper lobe of left lung / Top expressed in: right kidney; right ventricle; lip; spermatocyte; spermatid; molar; islet of Langerhans; morula; myocardium of ventricle; adrenal gland; More reference expression data
BioGPS	More reference expression data
Gene ontology
Molecular function	microtubule motor activity; nucleotide binding; microtubule binding; minus-end-directed microtubule motor activity; ATPase activity; protein binding; ATP binding
Cellular component	cytoplasm; centrosome; Golgi apparatus; membrane; adherens junction; microtubule organizing center; cell junction; zonula adherens; microtubule; extracellular exosome; cytoplasmic vesicle membrane; cytoskeleton; cytoplasmic vesicle; kinesin complex
Biological process	Golgi organization; epithelial cell-cell adhesion; microtubule-based movement; zonula adherens maintenance; microtubule-based process; visual perception
Sources:Amigo / QuickGO
Orthologs
Databases	NCBI: entry; OMA: entry
Species	Human	Mouse
Entrez	3801	16582
Ensembl	ENSG00000140859	ENSMUSG00000031788
UniProt	Q9BVG8	O35231
RefSeq (mRNA)	NM_001130099; NM_001130100; NM_005550; NM_001318710; NM_001318711 NM_001318712; NM_001318713; NM_001318714; NM_001318715	NM_001145831; NM_001145832; NM_010631; NM_001372312; NM_001372313 NM_001372314; NM_001372315; NM_001372316; NM_001372317
RefSeq (protein)	NP_001123571; NP_001123572; NP_001305639; NP_001305640; NP_001305641 NP_001305642; NP_001305643; NP_001305644; NP_005541	NP_001139303; NP_001139304; NP_034761; NP_001359241; NP_001359242 NP_001359243; NP_001359244; NP_001359245; NP_001359246
Location (UCSC)	Chr 16: 57.76 – 57.86 Mb	Chr 8: 95.83 – 95.93 Mb
PubMed search
- Wikidata
View/Edit Human	View/Edit Mouse

Kinesin-like protein KIFC3 is a protein that in humans is encoded by the KIFC3 gene.
