= KIF2A =

Protein-coding gene in the species Homo sapiens

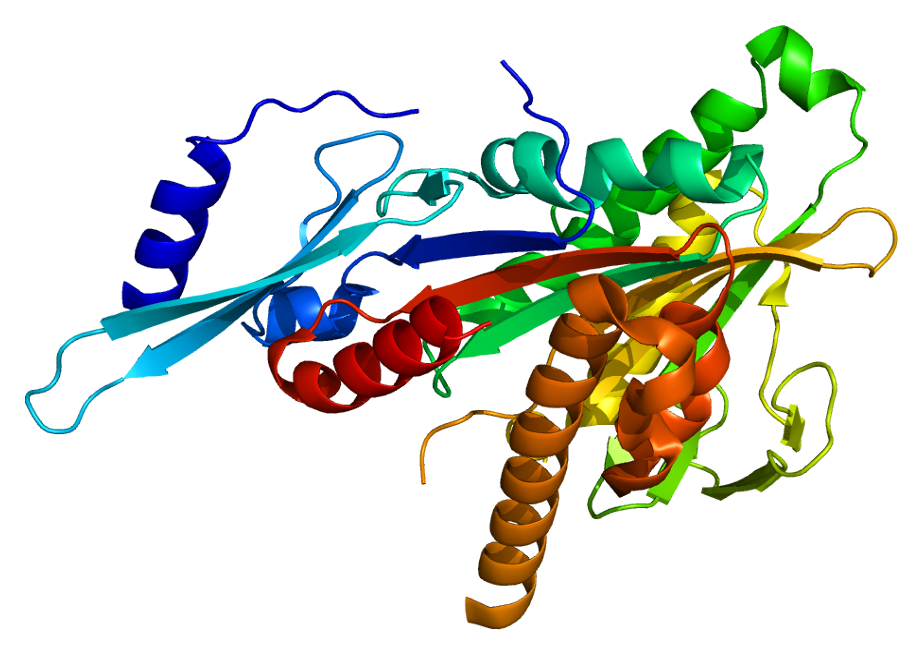

Identifiers
- Aliases: KIF2A, CDCBM3, HK2, KIF2, kinesin heavy chain member 2A, kinesin family member 2A
- External IDs: OMIM: 602591; MGI: 108390; GeneCards: KIF2A
Available structures
PDB	Ortholog search: PDBe RCSB
PDB	List of PDB id codes 2GRY

Gene location (Human)
Chr.	Chromosome 5 (human)
Band	5q12.1	Start	62,306,162 bp
Band	5q12.1	End	62,391,025 bp

Gene location (Mouse)
Chr.	Chromosome 13 (mouse)
Band	13|13 D2.1	Start	107,095,504 bp
Band	13|13 D2.1	End	107,158,634 bp
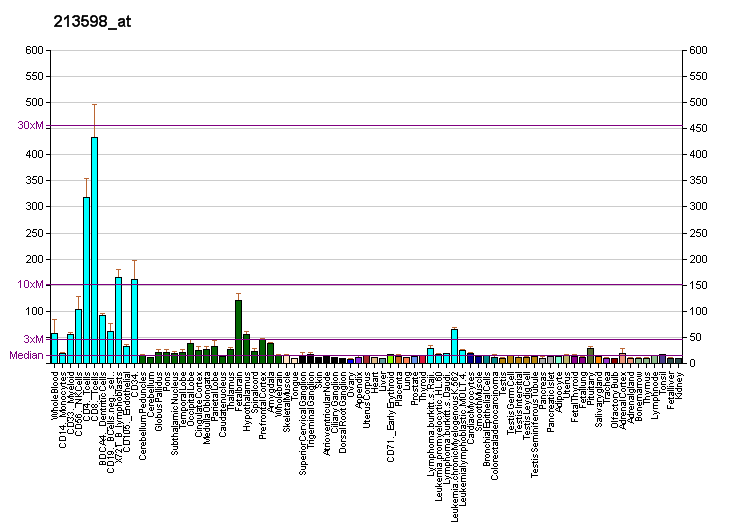

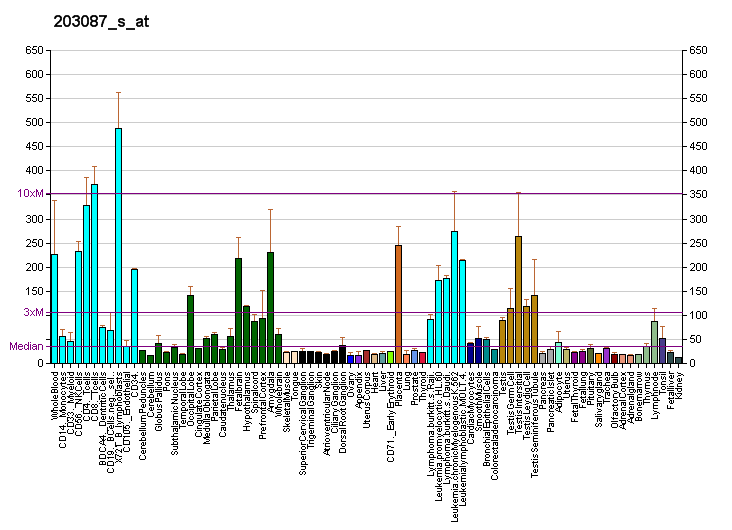

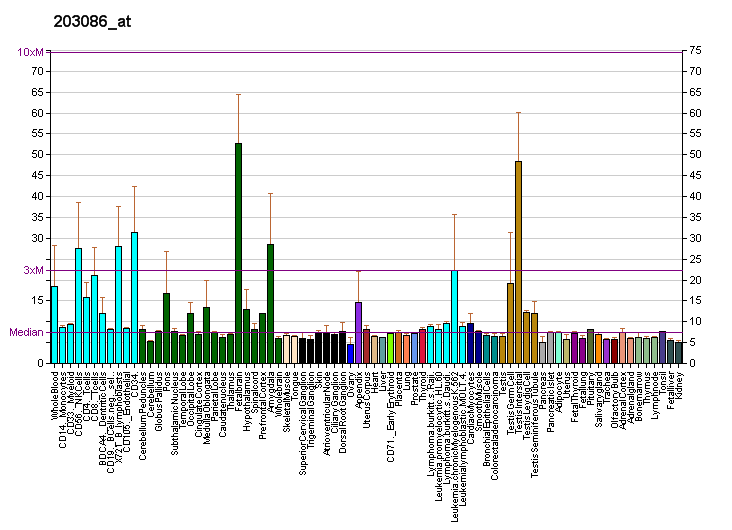
RNA expression pattern
Bgee	Human / Mouse (ortholog); Top expressed in: corpus callosum; ganglionic eminence; monocyte; sperm; ventricular zone; external globus pallidus; sural nerve; subthalamic nucleus; pars compacta; superior vestibular nucleus / Top expressed in: barrel cortex; blood; genital tubercle; habenula; tail of embryo; zygote; secondary oocyte; olfactory bulb; facial motor nucleus; spermatid; More reference expression data
BioGPS	More reference expression data
Gene ontology
Molecular function	microtubule motor activity; nucleotide binding; microtubule binding; ATPase activity; protein binding; cytoskeletal motor activity; ATP binding
Cellular component	cytoplasm; cytosol; centrosome; spindle pole; membrane; kinesin complex; spindle; microtubule organizing center; sperm principal piece; spindle microtubule; nucleolus; microtubule; cytoskeleton; nucleus; nuclear body; centriole; centriolar subdistal appendage
Biological process	cell differentiation; antigen processing and presentation of exogenous peptide antigen via MHC class II; mitotic spindle organization; nervous system development; cell division; multicellular organism development; microtubule-based movement; mitotic spindle assembly; cell cycle; retrograde vesicle-mediated transport, Golgi to endoplasmic reticulum; sister chromatid cohesion; microtubule cytoskeleton organization; microtubule depolymerization; regulation of cell migration
Sources:Amigo / QuickGO
Orthologs
Databases	NCBI: entry; OMA: entry
Species	Human	Mouse
Entrez	3796	16563
Ensembl	ENSG00000068796	ENSMUSG00000021693
UniProt	O00139	P28740
RefSeq (mRNA)	NM_004520; NM_001098511; NM_001243952; NM_001243953	NM_001145779; NM_008442; NM_001374727; NM_001378936; NM_001378937 NM_001378938; NM_001378939; NM_001378940
RefSeq (protein)	NP_001091981; NP_001230881; NP_001230882; NP_004511	NP_001139251; NP_032468; NP_001361656; NP_001365865; NP_001365866 NP_001365867; NP_001365868; NP_001365869
Location (UCSC)	Chr 5: 62.31 – 62.39 Mb	Chr 13: 107.1 – 107.16 Mb
PubMed search
- Wikidata
View/Edit Human	View/Edit Mouse

Kinesin-like protein KIF2A is a protein that in humans is encoded by the KIF2A gene. In mice, KIF2A is essential for proper neurogenesis and deficiency of KIF2A in mature neurons results in the loss of those neurons.

Kinesins, such as KIF2, are microtubule-associated motor proteins. For background information on kinesins, see MIM 148760.[supplied by OMIM]
