= KIF6 =

Protein-coding gene in the species Homo sapiens

Identifiers
- Aliases: KIF6, C6orf102, dJ1043E3.1, dJ137F1.4, dJ188D3.1, kinesin family member 6
- External IDs: OMIM: 613919; MGI: 1098238; GeneCards: KIF6

Gene location (Human)
Chr.	Chromosome 6 (human)
Band	6p21.2	Start	39,329,990 bp
Band	6p21.2	End	39,725,408 bp

Gene location (Mouse)
Chr.	Chromosome 17 (mouse)
Band	17|17 C	Start	49,922,164 bp
Band	17|17 C	End	50,216,875 bp
RNA expression pattern
Bgee	Human / Mouse (ortholog); Top expressed in: right uterine tube; corpus callosum; sperm; bronchial epithelial cell; C1 segment; oocyte; olfactory zone of nasal mucosa; testicle; substantia nigra; internal globus pallidus / Top expressed in: otolith organ; utricle; lumbar subsegment of spinal cord; spermatocyte; Rostral migratory stream; tail of embryo; embryo; embryo; lateral ventricle; choroid plexus of lateral ventricle; More reference expression data
BioGPS	n/a
Gene ontology
Molecular function	microtubule binding; microtubule motor activity; nucleotide binding; ATPase activity; protein binding; ATP binding
Cellular component	cytoplasm; male germ cell nucleus; microtubule; cytoskeleton; kinesin complex
Biological process	microtubule-based movement
Sources:Amigo / QuickGO
Orthologs
Databases	NCBI: entry; OMA: entry
Species	Human	Mouse
Entrez	221458	319991
Ensembl	ENSG00000164627	ENSMUSG00000023999
UniProt	Q6ZMV9	n/a
RefSeq (mRNA)	NM_001289020; NM_001289021; NM_001289024; NM_145027; NM_001351503 NM_001351566	NM_177052
RefSeq (protein)	NP_001275949; NP_001275950; NP_001275953; NP_659464; NP_001338432 NP_001338495	n/a
Location (UCSC)	Chr 6: 39.33 – 39.73 Mb	Chr 17: 49.92 – 50.22 Mb
PubMed search
- Wikidata
View/Edit Human	View/Edit Mouse

Kinesin family member 6 is a protein that in humans is encoded by the KIF6 gene. This gene encodes a member of the kinesin family of proteins. Members of this family are part of a multisubunit complex that functions as a microtubule motor in intracellular organelle transport.
