= Leelamine =

Names
- IUPAC name Abieta-8,11,13-trien-18-amine
- Systematic IUPAC name 1-[(1R,4aS,10aR)-1,4a-Dimethyl-7-(propan-2-yl)-1,2,3,4,4a,9,10,10a-octahydrophenanthren-1-yl]methanamine
- Other names (+)-Dehydroabietylamine; Amine D

Identifiers
CAS Number	1446-61-3
3D model (JSmol)	Interactive image
ChemSpider	55878
ECHA InfoCard	100.014.454
PubChem CID	62034
UNII	33289O147P
CompTox Dashboard (EPA)	DTXSID2041834
- InChI: InChI=1S/C20H31N/c1-14(2)15-6-8-17-16(12-15)7-9-18-19(3,13-21)10-5-11-20(17,18)4/h6,8,12,14,18H,5,7,9-11,13,21H2,1-4H3/t18-,19-,20+/m0/s1 Key: JVVXZOOGOGPDRZ-SLFFLAALSA-N; InChI=1/C20H31N/c1-14(2)15-6-8-17-16(12-15)7-9-18-19(3,13-21)10-5-11-20(17,18)4/h6,8,12,14,18H,5,7,9-11,13,21H2,1-4H3/t18-,19-,20+/m0/s1 Key: JVVXZOOGOGPDRZ-SLFFLAALBG
- SMILES: CC(C)c1ccc2c(c1)CC[C@@H]3[C@@]2(CCC[C@@]3(C)CN)C

Properties
Chemical formula	C_{20}H_{31}N
Molar mass	285.475 g·mol^{−1}
- Except where otherwise noted, data are given for materials in their standard state (at 25 °C [77 °F], 100 kPa). Infobox references

Leelamine (dehydroabietylamine) is a diterpene amine that has weak affinity for the cannabinoid receptors CB_{1} and CB_{2}, as well as being an inhibitor of pyruvate dehydrogenase kinase. Optically active leelamine is also used as a chiral resolving agent for carboxylic acids. Leelamine has been shown to be effective against certain cancer cells, independent from its activity on CB receptors or PDK1 - it accumulates inside the acidic lysosomes leading to disruption of intracellular cholesterol transport, autophagy and endocytosis followed by cell death.

== See also ==
- Abietic acid
