= KRP (biochemistry) =

Protein family

Kinesin-related proteins (KRP), also called the kinesin family, are a family of proteins related to kinesins. The bimC subfamily of KRPs (including the human protein KIF11) functions to separate the duplicated centrosomes during mitosis.

== Role in mitotic repair ==
Kinesin-13 MCAK (Mitotic Centromere-Associated Kinesin) is a KRP that is involved in resolving errors during mitosis involving kinetochore-microtubules. This process is associated with Aurora B Protein Kinase. When Aurora B's function is disrupted, MCAK ability to locate centromeres, which play a critical role in separation of chromosomes during mitosis, was suppressed. There are other environments in which MCAK's function is impaired, absent impact on its associated kinase. For example, alpha-tubulin detyrosination has been demonstrated to impact MCAK's mitotic repair capabilities, suggesting a potential cause of chromosomal instability.
