= KLC4 =

Protein-coding gene in Homo sapiens

Identifiers
- Aliases: KLC4, KNSL8, bA387M24.3, kinesin light chain 4
- External IDs: MGI: 1922014; GeneCards: KLC4

Gene location (Human)
Chr.	Chromosome 6 (human)
Band	6p21.1	Start	43,040,777 bp
Band	6p21.1	End	43,075,095 bp

Gene location (Mouse)
Chr.	Chromosome 17 (mouse)
Band	17|17 C	Start	46,941,550 bp
Band	17|17 C	End	46,956,948 bp
RNA expression pattern
Bgee	Human / Mouse (ortholog); Top expressed in: right lobe of liver; mucosa of transverse colon; right hemisphere of cerebellum; mucosa of ileum; apex of heart; rectum; right uterine tube; pituitary gland; anterior pituitary; right lobe of thyroid gland / Top expressed in: intestinal villus; right kidney; jejunum; Ileal epithelium; duodenum; proximal tubule; yolk sac; neural layer of retina; large intestine; colon; More reference expression data
BioGPS	n/a
Gene ontology
Molecular function	microtubule motor activity; protein binding
Cellular component	cytoplasm; microtubule; cytoskeleton; kinesin complex
Biological process	metabolism
Sources:Amigo / QuickGO
Orthologs
Databases	NCBI: entry; OMA: entry
Species	Human	Mouse
Entrez	89953	74764
Ensembl	ENSG00000137171	ENSMUSG00000003546
UniProt	Q9NSK0	Q9DBS5
RefSeq (mRNA)	NM_001289034; NM_001289035; NM_138343; NM_201521; NM_201522 NM_201523	NM_029091; NM_001357130
RefSeq (protein)	NP_001275963; NP_001275964; NP_612352; NP_958929; NP_958930 NP_958931; NP_001275963.1; NP_958929.1; NP_958930.1	NP_083367; NP_001344059
Location (UCSC)	Chr 6: 43.04 – 43.08 Mb	Chr 17: 46.94 – 46.96 Mb
PubMed search
- Wikidata
View/Edit Human	View/Edit Mouse

Kinesin light chain 4 is a protein that in humans is encoded by the KLC4 gene.
