= KIF13A =

Protein-coding gene in the species Homo sapiens

Identifiers
- Aliases: KIF13A, RBKIN, bA500C11.2, kinesin family member 13A
- External IDs: OMIM: 605433; MGI: 1098264; GeneCards: KIF13A

Gene location (Human)
Chr.	Chromosome 6 (human)
Band	6p22.3	Start	17,759,183 bp
Band	6p22.3	End	17,987,635 bp

Gene location (Mouse)
Chr.	Chromosome 13 (mouse)
Band	13|13 A5	Start	46,749,087 bp
Band	13|13 A5	End	46,929,867 bp
RNA expression pattern
Bgee	Human / Mouse (ortholog); Top expressed in: tendon of biceps brachii; Skeletal muscle tissue of rectus abdominis; Skeletal muscle tissue of biceps brachii; saphenous vein; internal globus pallidus; body of tongue; right ventricle; jejunum; synovial joint; nipple / Top expressed in: muscle of thigh; soleus muscle; retinal pigment epithelium; atrium; myocardium of ventricle; skeletal muscle tissue; genital tubercle; temporal muscle; digastric muscle; triceps brachii muscle; More reference expression data
BioGPS	n/a
Gene ontology
Molecular function	microtubule motor activity; nucleotide binding; microtubule binding; ATPase activity; protein binding; ATP binding
Cellular component	cytoplasm; endosome; centrosome; Golgi apparatus; trans-Golgi network membrane; membrane; kinesin complex; Golgi membrane; microtubule organizing center; midbody; endosome membrane; microtubule; cytoskeleton; intracellular anatomical structure
Biological process	plus-end-directed vesicle transport along microtubule; cytoskeleton-dependent intracellular transport; endosome to lysosome transport; cell division; melanosome organization; microtubule-based movement; vesicle cargo loading; protein transport; cell cycle; intracellular protein transport; Golgi to plasma membrane protein transport; regulation of cytokinesis
Sources:Amigo / QuickGO
Orthologs
Databases	NCBI: entry; OMA: entry
Species	Human	Mouse
Entrez	63971	16553
Ensembl	ENSG00000137177	ENSMUSG00000021375
UniProt	Q9H1H9	Q9EQW7
RefSeq (mRNA)	NM_001105566; NM_001105567; NM_001105568; NM_001243423; NM_022113	NM_010617
RefSeq (protein)	NP_001099036; NP_001099037; NP_001099038; NP_001230352; NP_071396	NP_034747
Location (UCSC)	Chr 6: 17.76 – 17.99 Mb	Chr 13: 46.75 – 46.93 Mb
PubMed search
- Wikidata
View/Edit Human	View/Edit Mouse

Kinesin-like protein KIF13A is a protein that in humans is encoded by the KIF13A gene.

== Interactions ==
KIF13A has been shown to interact with AP1B1.
