= Stuart Schreiber =

American chemist

Stuart L. Schreiber
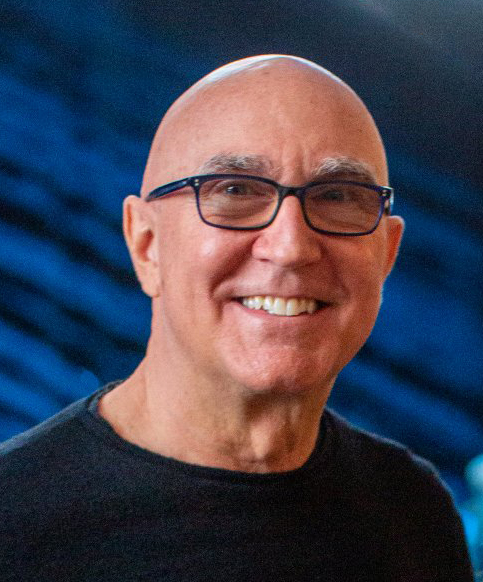
- Born: February 6, 1956 (age 70); Eatontown, New Jersey, U.S.
- Education: University of Virginia; Harvard University
- Awards: Arthur C. Cope Award (2015); Wolf Prize (2016); Robert Koch Gold Medal (2024); Welch Award in Chemistry (2025)
- Scientific career
- Fields: Chemical biology
- Workplaces: Yale University; Harvard University; Broad Institute
- Thesis: I: Oxidation of tertiary amines / II: Peroxides in organic synthesis (1981)
- Doctoral advisor: Robert Burns Woodward; Yoshito Kishi

Stuart Schreiber (born February 6, 1956) is an American chemist who is the Morris Loeb Research Professor at Harvard University, a co-founder of the Broad Institute, Howard Hughes Medical Institute Investigator, Emeritus, and a member of the National Academy of Sciences and National Academy of Medicine. From 2024 to 2025 he led Arena BioWorks.

His work integrates chemical biology and human biology to advance the science of therapeutics. Key advances include the discovery that small molecules can function as “molecular glues” that promote protein–protein interactions, the co-discovery of mTOR and its role in nutrient-response signaling, the discovery of histone deacetylases and (with Michael Grunstein and David Allis) the demonstration that chromatin marks regulate gene expression, the development and application of diversity-oriented synthesis to microbial therapeutics, and the discovery of vulnerabilities of cancer cells linked to genetic, lineage and cell-state features, including ferroptotic vulnerabilities. His awards include the Wolf Prize in Chemistry and the Arthur Cope Award. His approach to discovering new therapeutics guided many biotechnology companies that he founded, including Vertex Pharmaceuticals and Ariad Pharmaceuticals. He has founded or co-founded 14 biotechnology companies, which have developed 16 first-in-human approved drugs or advanced clinical candidates.

== Early life ==
Schreiber was born on February 6, 1956, in Eatontown, New Jersey, to Mary Geraldine Schreiber and Thomas Sewell Schreiber. From the ages of one to four he lived with his family in Villennes-sur-Seine, a small village in France, where his father was a battalion commander at Supreme Headquarters Allied Powers Europe. Shortly after returning to New Jersey, they moved to Fairfax, VA, where Tom Schreiber worked as an applied mathematician and physicist at Signal Corp on Fort Monmouth. At age 61, Schreiber discovered that Tom Schreiber was not his biological father.

Schreiber attended Luther Jackson Junior High School in Falls Church, VA and graduated from Oakton High School in Fairfax, VA in 1973 after completing a 3-year work study program that prepared him for work in the construction field.

== Education and training ==
Schreiber obtained a Bachelor of Science degree in chemistry from the University of Virginia in 1977, after which he entered Harvard University as a graduate student in chemistry. He joined the research group of Robert B. Woodward and after Woodward's death continued his studies under the supervision of Yoshito Kishi. In 1980, he joined the faculty of Yale University as an assistant professor in chemistry, and in 1988 he moved to Harvard University as the Morris Loeb Professor.

== Career ==
Schreiber started his research work in organic synthesis, focusing on concepts such as the use of [2 + 2] photocycloadditions to establish stereochemistry in complex molecules, the fragmentation of hydroperoxides to produce macrolides, ancillary stereocontrol, group selectivity and two-directional synthesis. Notable accomplishments include the total syntheses of complex natural products such as periplanone B, talaromycin B, asteltoxin, avenaciolide, gloeosporone, hikizimicin, mycoticin A, epoxydictymene and the immunosuppressant FK-506.

Following his work on the FK506-binding protein FKBP12 in 1988, Schreiber reported that the small molecules FK506 and cyclosporin inhibit the activity of the phosphatase calcineurin by forming the ternary complexes FKBP12-FK506-calcineurin and cyclophilin-ciclosporin-calcineurin. This work, together with work by Gerald Crabtree at Stanford University concerning the NFAT proteins, led to the elucidation of the calcium-calcineurin-NFAT signaling pathway.

In 1993, Schreiber and Crabtree developed bifunctional molecules or “chemical inducers of proximity” (CIPs), which provide small-molecule activation over numerous signaling molecules and pathways (e.g., the Fas, insulin, TGFβ and T-cell receptors) through proximity effects. Schreiber and Crabtree demonstrated that small molecules could activate a signaling pathway in an animal with temporal and spatial control. Dimerizer kits have been distributed freely resulting in many peer-reviewed publications. Its promise in gene therapy has been highlighted by the ability of a small molecule to activate a small-molecule regulated EPO receptor and to induce erythropoiesis (Ariad Pharmaceuticals, Inc.), and more recently in human clinical trials for treatment of graft-vs-host disease.

In 1994, Schreiber and co-workers investigated (independently with David Sabitini) the master regulator of nutrient sensing, mTOR. They found that the small molecule rapamycin simultaneously binds FKBP12 and mTOR (originally named FKBP12-rapamycin binding protein, FRAP). Using diversity-oriented synthesis and small-molecule screening, Schreiber illuminated the nutrient-response signaling network involving TOR proteins in yeast and mTOR in mammalian cells. Small molecules such as uretupamine and rapamycin were shown to be particularly effective in revealing the ability of proteins such as mTOR, Tor1p, Tor2p, and Ure2p to receive multiple inputs and to process them appropriately towards multiple outputs (in analogy to multi-channel processors). Several pharmaceutical companies are now targeting the nutrient-signaling network for the treatment of several forms of cancer, including solid tumors.

In 1995, Schreiber and co-workers found that the small molecule lactacystin binds and inhibits specific catalytic subunits of the proteasome, a protein complex responsible for the bulk of proteolysis in the cell, as well as proteolytic activation of certain protein substrates. As a non-peptidic proteasome inhibitor lactacysin has proven useful in the study of proteasome function. Lactacystin modifies the amino-terminal threonine of specific proteasome subunits. This work helped to establish the proteasome as a mechanistically novel class of protease: an amino-terminal threonine protease.

In 1996, Schreiber and co-workers used the small molecules trapoxin and depudecin to investigate the histone deacetylases (HDACs). Prior to Schreiber's work in this area, the HDAC proteins had not been isolated. Coincident with the HDAC work, Charles David Allis and colleagues reported work on the histone acetyltransferases (HATs). These two contributions catalyzed much research in this area, eventually leading to the characterization of numerous histone-modifying enzymes, their resulting histone “marks”, and numerous proteins that bind to these marks. By taking a global approach to understanding chromatin function, Schreiber proposed a “signaling network model” of chromatin and compared it to an alternative view, the “histone code hypothesis” presented by Brian D. Strahl and Charles David Allis.

== Diversity-oriented synthesis ==
Schreiber applied small molecules to biology through the development of diversity-oriented synthesis (DOS), chemical genetics, and ChemBank. Schreiber has shown that DOS can produce small molecules distributed in defined ways in chemical space by virtue of their different skeletons and stereochemistry, and that it can provide chemical handles on products anticipating the need for follow-up chemistry using, for example, combinatorial synthesis and the so-called Build/Couple/Pair strategy of modular chemical synthesis. DOS pathways and new techniques for small-molecule screening provided many new, potentially disruptive insights into biology. Small-molecule probes of histone and tubulin deacetylases, transcription factors, cytoplasmic anchoring proteins, developmental signaling proteins (e.g., histacin, tubacin, haptamide, uretupamine, concentramide, and calmodulophilin), among many others, have been uncovered in the Schreiber lab using diversity-oriented synthesis and chemical genetics. Multidimensional screening was introduced in 2002 and has provided insights into tumorigenesis, cell polarity, and chemical space, among others.

Using diversity-oriented synthesis, the Schreiber Lab and collaborators discovered numerous novel antimicrobial compounds including the bicyclic azetidine BRD7929 that could both cure and prevent the transmission of malaria in mice, targeting multiple steps in the life cycle of Plasmodium falciparum. They found another synthetic azetidine derivative, BRD4592, which kills Mycobacterium tuberculosis through allosteric inhibition of its tryptophan synthase. High throughput screens further uncovered compounds that inhibit replication of Trypanosoma cruzi and Hepatitis C virus, and inhibit Toxoplasma gondii growth.

== Other research ==
Schreiber also contributed to more conventional small molecule discovery projects. He collaborated with Tim Mitchison to discover monastrol – the first small-molecule inhibitor of mitosis that does not target tubulin. Monastrol was shown to inhibit kinesin-5, a motor protein and was used to gain new insights into the functions of kinesin-5. This work led pharmaceutical company Merck, among others, to pursue anti-cancer drugs that target human kinesin-5.

Schrieber and McManus discovered that when certain aggressive cancer cells become resistant to drug treatments, they also become vulnerable to ferroptosis—a natural cellular self-destruction mechanism triggered by peroxide and iron ions undergoing the Fenton reaction. Free radicals unleash a chain reaction turning normal lipids in the cell membrane into toxic radical species. They found that drug-resistant cancer cells that have acquired this new vulnerability rely on an enzyme called GPX4 for survival. GPX4 stops the chain reaction leading to ferroptosis by converting the dangerous lipid peroxides to benign alcohols. They further showed that a small molecule inhibitor of GPX4 kills cancer cells by increasing their vulnerability to ferroptosis.

== Impact on chemical biology ==
Schreiber has used small molecules to study three specific areas of biology, and then through the more general application of small molecules in biomedical research. Academic screening centers have been created that emulate the Harvard Institute of Chemistry and Cell Biology and the Broad Institute; in the U.S., there has been a nationwide effort to expand this capability via the government-sponsored NIH Road Map. Chemistry departments have changed their names to include the term chemical biology and new journals have been introduced (Cell Chemical Biology, ChemBioChem, Nature Chemical Biology, ACS Chemical Biology]) to cover the field. Schreiber has been involved in the founding of numerous biopharmaceutical companies whose research relies on chemical biology: Vertex Pharmaceuticals, Inc. (VRTX), Ariad Pharmaceuticals, Inc. (ARIA), Infinity Pharmaceuticals, Inc (INFI), Forma Therapeutics, H3 Biomedicine, Jnana Therapeutics, and Kojin Therapeutics. These companies have produced new therapeutics in several disease areas, including cystic fibrosis and cancer.

== Selected awards ==
- ACS Award in Pure Chemistry (1989)
- Ciba-Geigy Drew Award for Biomedical Research: Molecular Basis for Immune Regulation (1992)
- Leo Hendrik Baekeland Award, North Jersey Section of ACS (1993)
- Eli Lilly Award in Biological Chemistry, ACS (1993)
- American Chemical Society Award in Synthetic Organic Chemistry (1994)
- George Ledlie Prize (Harvard University) (1994)
- Paul Karrer Gold Medal (1994) at the University of Zurich.
- Harrison Howe Award (1995)
- Warren Triennial Award (shared with Leland Hartwell) (1995)
- Tetrahedron Prize for Creativity in Organic Chemistry (1997)
- ACS Award for Bioorganic Chemistry (2000)
- William H. Nichols Medal (2001)
- Chiron Corporation Biotechnology Research Award, American Academy of Microbiology (2001)
- Society for Biomolecular Screening Achievement Award (2004)
- American Association of Cancer Institutes (2004)
- Arthur C. Cope Award (2014)
- Nagoya Gold Medal (2015)
- Wolf Prize (2016)
- National Academy of Medicine, elected 2018
- Robert Koch Gold Medal (2025) for "outstanding life achievements of a scientist"
- Robert A. Welch Award (2025) "For Work Foundational to the Field of Chemical Biology"
