= Mitotic catastrophe =

Mechanism of cell death

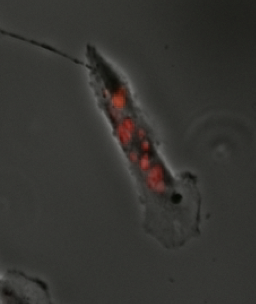
A cell that has been treated with taxol and had a catastrophic mitosis. The cell has become multinucleated after an unsuccessful mitosis.

Mitotic catastrophe has been defined as either a cellular mechanism to prevent potentially cancerous cells from proliferating or as a mode of cellular death that occurs following improper cell cycle progression or entrance. Mitotic catastrophe can be induced by prolonged activation of the spindle assembly checkpoint, errors in mitosis, or DNA damage and operates to prevent genomic instability. It is a mechanism that is being researched as a potential therapeutic target in cancers, and numerous approved therapeutics induce mitotic catastrophe.

== Term usage ==
Multiple attempts to specifically define mitotic catastrophe have been made since the term was first used to describe a temperature dependent lethality in the yeast, Schizosaccharomyces pombe, that demonstrated abnormal segregation of chromosomes. The term has been used to define a mechanism of cellular death that occurs while a cell is in mitosis or as a method of oncosuppression that prevents potentially tumorigenic cells from dividing. This oncosuppression is accomplished by initiating a form of cell death such as apoptosis or necrosis or by inducing cellular senescence.

=== Mechanism to prevent cancer development ===
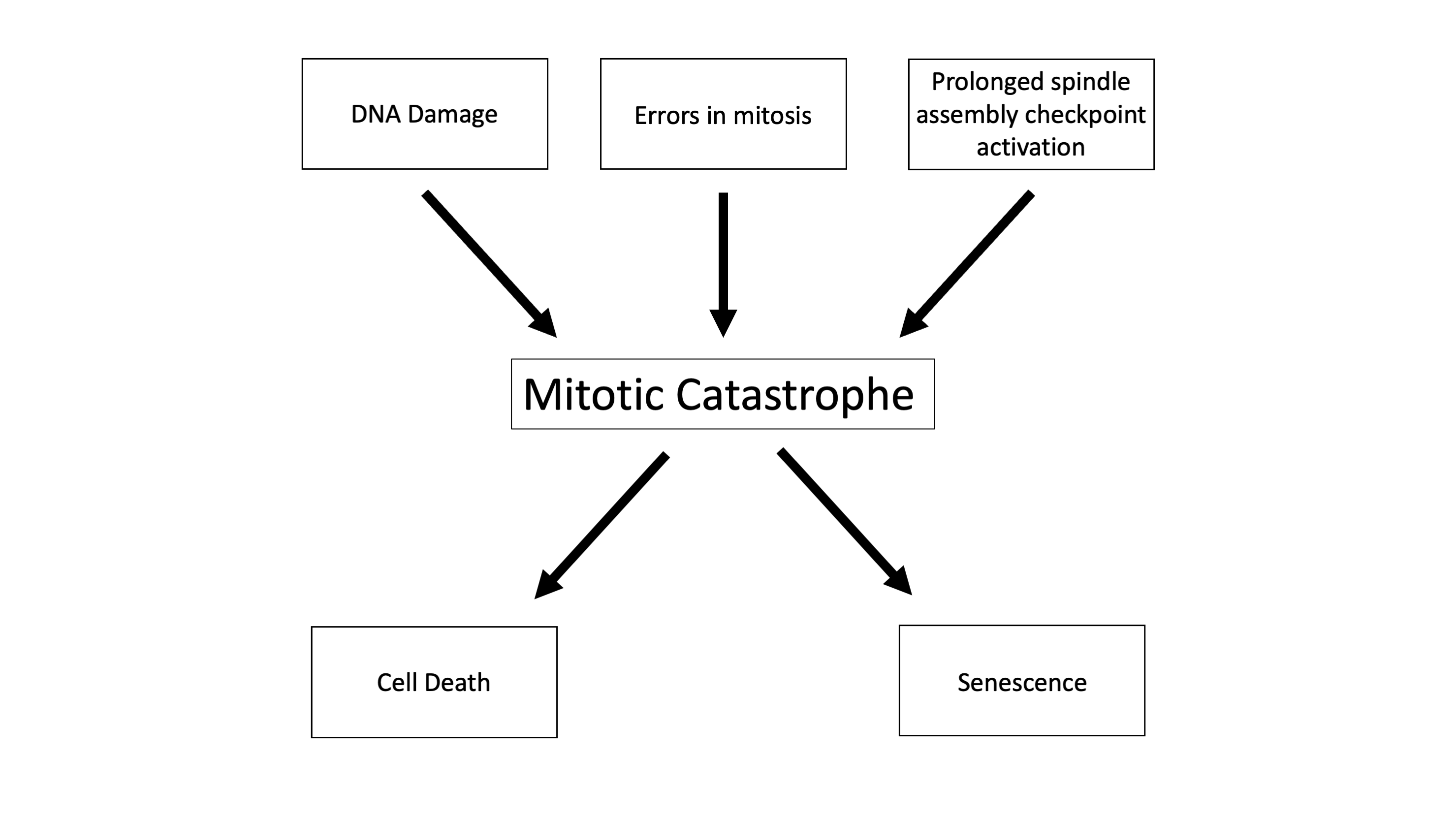
Diagram showing events that can lead to mitotic catastrophe and the potential outcomes.

One usage of the term mitotic catastrophe is to describe an oncosuppressive mechanism (i.e. a mechanism to prevent the proliferation of cancerous cells and the development of tumors) that occurs when cells undergo and detect a defective mitosis has occurred. This definition of this mechanism has been described by the International Nomenclature Committee on Cell Death. Under this definition, cells that undergo mitotic catastrophe either senesce and stop dividing or undergo a regulated form of cell death during mitosis or another form of cell death in the next G_{1} phase of the cell cycle. The function of this mechanism is to prevent cells from accruing genomic instability which can lead to tumorigenesis.

When the cell undergoes cell death during mitosis this is known as mitotic death. This is characterized by high levels of cyclin B1 still present in the cell at the time of cell death indicating the cell never finished mitosis. Mitotic catastrophe can also lead to the cell being fated for cell death by apoptosis or necrosis following interphase of the cell cycle. However, the timing of cell death can vary from hours after mitosis completes to years later which has been witnessed in human tissues treated with radiotherapy. The least common outcome of mitotic catastrophe is senescence in which the cell stops dividing and enters a permanent cell cycle arrest that prevents the cell from proliferating any further.

=== Mechanism of cellular death ===
Another usage of the term mitotic catastrophe is to describe a mode of cell death that occurs during mitosis. This cell death can occur due to an accumulation of DNA damage in the presence of improperly functioning DNA structure checkpoints or an improperly functioning spindle assembly checkpoint. Cells that undergo mitotic catastrophe death can lack activation of pathways of the traditional death pathways such as apoptosis. While more recent definitions of mitotic catastrophe do not use it to describe a bona fide cell death mechanism, some publications describe it as a mechanism of cell death.

== Causes ==
=== Prolonged spindle assembly checkpoint activation ===
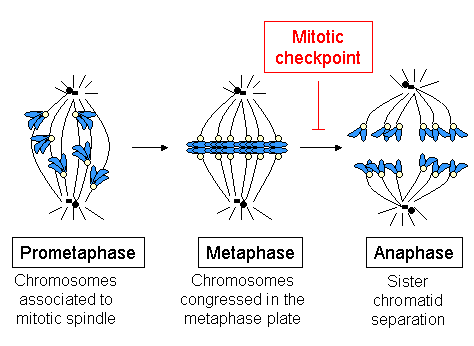
Mitotic checkpoint (also known as spindle assembly checkpoint) prevents the cell progressing from metaphase to anaphase if not all of the chromosomes are properly attached by mitotic spindles.

Cells have a mechanism to prevent improper segregation of chromosomes known as the spindle assembly checkpoint or mitotic checkpoint. The spindle assembly checkpoint verifies that mitotic spindles have properly attached to the kinetochores of each pair of chromosomes before the chromosomes segregate during cell division. If the mitotic spindles are not properly attached to the kinetochores then the spindle assembly checkpoint will prevent the transition from metaphase to anaphase. This mechanism is important to ensure that the DNA within the cell is divided equally between the two daughter cells. When the spindle assembly checkpoint is activated, it arrests the cell in mitosis until all chromosomes are properly attached and aligned. If the checkpoint is activated for a prolonged period it can lead to mitotic catastrophe.

Prolonged activation of the spindle assembly checkpoint inhibits the anaphase promoting complex. Normally, activation of the anaphase promoting complex leads to the separation of sister chromatids and the cell exiting mitosis. The mitotic checkpoint complex acts as a negative regulator of the anaphase promoting complex. Unattached kinetochores promote the formation of the mitotic checkpoint complex which is composed of four different proteins known as Mad2, Cdc20, BubR1, and Bub3 in humans. When the mitotic checkpoint complex is formed, it binds to the anaphase promoting complex and prevents its ability to promote cell cycle progression.

=== Errors in mitosis ===
Expression of cyclin levels during different phases of the cell cycle. Cyclin B promotes progression to mitosis and once the cell is in mitosis normally prevents the cell from exiting mitosis prematurely.

Some cells can have an erroneous mitosis yet survive and undergo another cell division which puts the cell at a higher likelihood to undergo mitotic catastrophe. For instance, cells can undergo a process called mitotic slippage where cells exit mitosis too early before the process of mitosis is finished. In this case, the cell finishes mitosis in the presence of spindle assembly checkpoint signaling which would normally prevent the cell from exiting mitosis. This phenomenon is caused by improper degradation of cyclin B1 and can result in chromosome missegregation events. Cyclin B1 is a major regulator of the cell cycle and guides the cells progression from G2 to M phase. Cyclin B1 works with its binding partner CDK1 to control this progression and the complex is known as the mitotic promoting factor. While the mitotic promoting factor is utilized to guide the cells entry into mitosis, its destruction also guides the cells exit from mitosis. Normally, cyclin B1 degradation is initiated by the anaphase promoting complex after all of the kinetochores have been properly attached by mitotic spindle fibers. However, when cyclin B1 levels are degraded too fast this can result in the cell exiting mitosis prematurely resulting in potential mitotic errors including missegregation of chromosomes.

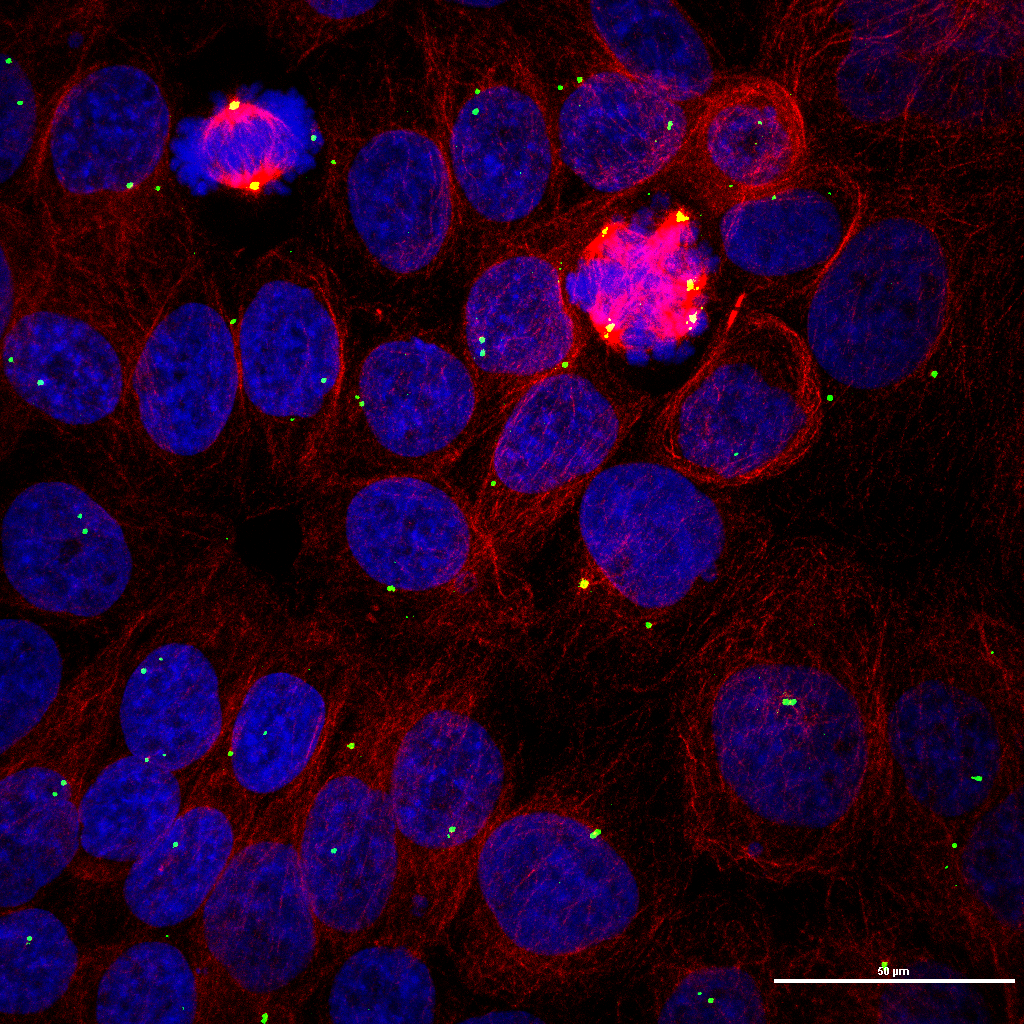
An example of a normal mitosis on the left and a multipolar mitosis on the right. Microtubules are in red and the centrosomes are in yellow.

Tetraploid or otherwise aneuploid cells are at higher risk of mitotic catastrophe. Tetraploid cells are cells that have duplicated their genetic material, but have not undergo cytokinesis to split into two daughter cells and thus remain as one cell. Aneuploid cells are cells that have an incorrect number of chromosomes including whole additions of chromosomes or complete losses of chromosomes. Cells with an abnormal number of chromosomes are more likely to have chromosome segregation errors that result in mitotic catastrophe. Cells that become aneuploid often are prevented from further cell growth and division by the activation of tumor suppressor pathways such as p53 which drives the cell to a non-proliferating state known as cellular senescence. Given that aneuploid cells can often become tumorigenic, this mechanism prevents the propagation of these cells and thus prevents the development of cancers in the organism.

Cells that undergo multipolar divisions, or in other words split into more than 2 daughter cells, are at a higher risk of mitotic catastrophe as well. While many of the progeny of multipolar divisions do not survive due to highly imbalanced chromosome numbers, most of the cells that survive and undergo a subsequent mitosis are likely to experience mitotic catastrophe. These multipolar divisions occur due to the presence of more than two centrosomes. Centrosomes are cellular organelles that acts to organize the mitotic spindle assembly in the cell during mitosis and thus guide the segregation of chromosomes during mitosis. Normally, cells will have two centrosomes that guide sister chromatids to opposite poles of the dividing cell. However, when there are more than two centrosomes present in mitosis they can pull chromosomes in incorrect directions resulting in daughter cells that are inviable. Many cancers have excessive numbers of centrosomes, but to prevent inviable daughter cells, the cancer cells have developed mechanisms to cluster their centrosomes. When the centrosomes are clustered to two poles of the dividing cell, the chromosomes are segregated properly and two daughter cells are formed. Thus, cancers that are able to adapt to a higher number of centrosomes are able to are able to prevent mitotic catastrophe and propagate in the presence of their extra centrosomes.

=== DNA damage ===
High levels of DNA damage that are not repaired before the cell enters mitosis can result in a mitotic catastrophe. Cells that have a compromised G2 checkpoint do not have the ability to prevent progression through the cell cycle even when there is DNA damage present in the cell's genome. The G2 checkpoint normally functions to stop cells that have damaged DNA from progressing to mitosis. The G2 checkpoint can be compromised if tumor suppressor p53 is no longer present in the cell. The response to DNA damage present during mitosis is different from the response to DNA damage detected during the rest of the cell cycle. Cells can detect DNA defects during the rest of the cell cycle and either repair them if possible or undergo apoptosis of senescence. Given that when this happens the cell does not progress into mitosis it is not considered a mitotic catastrophe.

== Mitotic catastrophe in cancer ==
=== Prevention of genomic instability ===
Video of a cell treated with taxol undergoing mitotic catastrophe.

Genomic instability is one of the hallmarks of cancer cells and promotes genetic changes (both large chromosomal changes as well as individual nucleotide changes) in cancer cells which can lead to increased levels of tumor progression through genetic variation in the tumor cell. Cancers with a higher level of genomic instability have been shown to have worse patient outcomes than those cancers which have lower levels of genomic instability. Cells have gained mechanisms that resist increased genomic instability in cells. Mitotic catastrophe is one way in which cells prevent the propagation of genomically unstable cells. If mitotic catastrophe fails for cells whose genome has become unstable they can propagate uncontrollably and potentially become tumorigenic.

The level of genomic instability is different across cancer types with epithelial cancers being more genomically unstable than cancers of hematological or mesenchymal origin. Mesothelioma, small-cell lung cancer, breast, ovarian, non-small cell lung cancer, and liver cancer exhibit high levels of genomic instability while acute lymphoblastic leukemia, myelodysplasia, and myeloproliferative disorder have lower levels of instability.

=== Anticancer therapeutics ===
Chemical structure of Paclitaxel (Taxol), an anticancer therapeutic that can induce mitotic catastrophe.

Promotion of mitotic catastrophe in cancer cells is an area of cancer therapeutic research that has garnered interest and is seen as a potential target to overcome resistance developed to current chemotherapies. Cancer cells have been found to be more sensitive to mitotic catastrophe induction than non-cancerous cells in the body. Tumors cells often have inactivated the machinery that is required for apoptosis such as the p53 protein. This is usually achieved by mutations in the p53 protein or by loss of the chromosome region that contains the genetic code for it. p53 acts to prevent the propagation of tumor cells and is considered a major tumor suppressor protein. p53 works by either halting progression through the cell cycle when uncontrolled cell division is sensed or it can promote cell death through apoptosis in the presence of irreparable DNA damage. Mitotic catastrophe can occur in a p53 independent fashion and thus presents a therapeutic avenue of interest. Furthermore, doses of DNA damaging drugs lower than lethal levels have been shown to induce mitotic catastrophe. This would allow for administration of a drug while the patient has fewer side effects.

Cancer therapies can induce mitotic catastrophe by either damaging the cells DNA or inhibiting spindle assembly. Drugs, known as spindle poisons, affect the polymerization or depolymerization of microtubule spindles and thus interfere with the correct formation of the mitotic spindles. When this happens, the spindle assembly checkpoint becomes activated and the transition from metaphase to anaphase is inhibited.

Cancer drugs that induce mitotic catastrophe
Drug	Approved uses / clinical trial phase / research use	Mechanism of action
Paclitaxel	Approved use: AIDS-related Kaposi sarcoma, breast cancer, non-small cell lung cancer, and ovarian cancer	Promotes microtubule spindle assembly and prevents the detachment of microtubules preventing the cell from properly entering or exiting mitosis.
Docetaxel	Approved use: Breast cancer, non-small cell lung cancer, prostate cancer, head and neck squamous cell carcinoma, stomach adenocarcinoma, and gastroesophageal junction adenocarcinoma	Promotes microtubule spindle assembly and prevents the detachment of microtubules preventing the cell from properly entering or exiting mitosis.
Vinblastin	Approved use: Breast cancer, Choriocarcinoma, Hodgkin lymphoma, Kaposi sarcoma, mycosis fungoides, non-Hodgkin lymphoma, testicular germ cell tumors	Depolymerizes microtubules
Vinkristine	Approved use: Acute lymphoblastic leukemia, lymphomas, neuroblastoma, sarcomas, and central nervous system tumors	Depolymerizes microtubules
Monastrol	Research use	EG5 Inhibitor which perturbs the movement of chromosomes during mitosis. This perturbation results in cells dying in mitosis or in the subsequent interphase.
ARRY-520 (Filanesib)	Phase III clinical trial: multiple myeloma	EG5 Inhibitor which perturbs the movement of chromosomes during mitosis. This perturbation results in cells dying in mitosis or in the subsequent interphase.
VX-680	Pre-clinical research	AURKA / AURKB inhibitor which disrupts the movement of chromosomes and the cytoskeleton during mitosis
MLN8237	Phase I clinical trial: pediatric recurrent atypical teratoid rhabdoid tumors and pediatric advanced solid tumors Failed clinical trial for adult lymphomas and lung cancer	AURKA / AURKB inhibitor which disrupts the movement of chromosomes and the cytoskeleton during mitosis

== See also ==
- Mitosis
- Cancer
- Apoptosis
- Senescence
