= Gerald Crabtree =

American biochemist (born 1946)

Gerald R. Crabtree
- Born: December 18, 1946 (age 79); Wheeling, West Virginia
- Education: West Liberty State College, Temple University
- Known for: Ca^{2+}-calcineurin-NFAT signaling pathway
- Awards: NIH Director's Award, Warner Lambert Park Davis Awardaw
- Scientific career
- Fields: Developmental Biology
- Workplaces: Stanford University
- Notable students: Albert Fornace, Paul Khavari, Diana Hargreaves, Cigall Kadoch

Gerald R. Crabtree is the David Korn Professor at Stanford University and an Investigator in the Howard Hughes Medical Institute. He is known for defining the Ca^{2+}-calcineurin-NFAT signaling pathway, pioneering the development of synthetic ligands for regulation of biologic processes and discovering chromatin regulatory mechanisms involved in cancer and brain development. He is a founder of Ariad Pharmaceuticals, Amplyx Pharmaceuticals, Foghorn Therapeutics, and Shenandoah Therapeutics (Shenandoah Therapeutics was mentioned in a July 26, 2023 New York Times online article by Gina Kolata).

== Education and training ==
Crabtree grew up near Wellsburg, West Virginia, earned his B.S. in Chemistry and Mathematics from West Liberty State College and his M.D. from Temple University. While at medical school, he became interested in laboratory research and started to work at Dartmouth College with Allan Munck on the biochemistry of steroid hormones.

== Key discoveries 1980s, 1990s and 2010s ==
In the early 1980s Crabtree worked with Albert J. Fornace Jr. to use early bioinformatics approaches to identify remnants of transposition events (rearrangements) in the human genome and to discover the HNF1 transcription factor. In 1982 Crabtree discovered that one gene could produce more than one protein thereby demonstrating that the coding capability of the genome is larger than expected and breaking the long-held dictum: "one gene; one protein".

In the late 1980s and early 1990s, Crabtree mapped the pathways initiated by the antigen receptor on T cells by beginning in the nucleus with the early T cell activation genes like IL-2 and working biochemically toward the cell membrane. These studies led to the discovery of NFAT and the conclusion that membrane signaling by the antigen receptor led to the rapid nuclear entry of this transcription factor and the activation of group of genes like Il-2, gamma interferon and others essential for the immune response. Crabtree, along with Stuart Schreiber, also further defined the Ca^{2+}/calcineurin/ NFAT signaling pathway, which carries signals from the cell surface to the nucleus to activate immune response genes. These discoveries resulted in the first understanding of the mechanism of action of the two most commonly used immunosuppressant drugs: cyclosporine and FK506. Crabtree and Schreiber found that these drugs prevent signals originating at the cell membrane from entering the nucleus by blocking the actions of the phosphatase, calcineurin preventing the entry of the NFATc proteins into the nucleus. NFAT proteins activate a large group of genes necessary for the immune response. When these genes are not activated, as occurs with Cyclosporine or FK506 administration, transplant rejection is prevented. The elucidation of the Ca^{2+} - Calcineurin-NFAT signaling pathway and the discovery that it is the target of Cyclosporine and FK506 was covered in the New York Times. Later his laboratory used genetic approaches in mice to show that calcineurin-NFAT signaling plays essential roles in the development of many vertebrate organ systems and its dysregulation is likely to be responsible for many of the phenotypes of Down Syndrome. The understanding of this signaling pathway provided one of the first biochemical bridges from the cell membrane to the nucleus. (see also: Stuart Schreiber).

In 1992, working with Calvin Kuo, then a graduate student in his laboratory, he discovered that the immunosuppressive drug, rapamycin blocked a biochemical pathway leading to protein synthesis in response to membrane cell proliferation signals. This work contributed to the development of rapamycin as a therapeutic for certain human cancers and also played a role in the founding of Ariad Pharmaceuticals in Cambridge, Massachusetts.

In 1993 Crabtree and Stuart Schreiber designed and synthesized the first synthetic ligands to induce proximity of proteins within cells. Crabtree then used these molecules to understand the role of proximity in biologic regulation. His studies revealed that chemically induced proximity was a fundamental mechanism underlying many aspects of cellular signaling, including receptor activation, kinase function, protein localization, transcription and epigenetic regulation. He generalized this approach to other types of chemical inducers of proximity (CIPs) including natural molecules involved in plant signaling that have expanded the usefulness of this approach. At present CIPs are being used to probe the function of many signaling pathways and biologic events within cells. This approach has proved useful in rapidly activating and inactivating molecules to allow one to study their function. Crabtree and colleagues Nathan Hathaway and Oli Bell have used induced proximity to make measurements of the dynamics of chromatin regulation in living cells leading to an understanding of the stability of epigenetic changes involved in cellular memory. The development of chemical inducers of proximity by Crabtree and Schreiber was covered in the New York Times and also in Discovery Magazine in 1996. Later, Ariad Pharmaceuticals developed this technology for gene therapy. These discoveries led Craig Crews at Yale to develop PROTACS for the selective degradation of therapeutic targets.

More recently, Crabtree and colleague Nathanael Gray at Stanford have made use of induced proximity to rewire the cancer cell to kill itself using its own mutated driver thereby specifically killing the mutated cancer cell and not normal cells lacking the mutation. This gain-of-function strategy shows promise for avoiding cancer relapse due to secondary cancer drivers and compensation. The development of these molecules (TCIPs for Transcription/epigenetic Chemical Inducers of Proximity) was covered in the New York Times by Gina Kolata.

In the early 1990s Crabtree worked with Paul Khavari, now the Carl J. Herzog Professor of Medicine at Stanford University, to define the mammalian SWI/SNF or BAF complex by purifying and cloning the genes that encode its subunits. Using biochemical and genetic approaches he discovered that the genes that encode its subunits are put together like letters in a word to give a wide variety of different biological meanings. In 2009 he worked with postdoctoral fellow, Andrew Yoo to discover a genetic circuitry controlling the assembly of specialized, brain-specific chromatin regulatory complexes necessary for the development of the mammalian nervous system and demonstrated that recapitulating this circuitry in mammalian cells converts human skin cells to neurons.

Crabtree's laboratory completed the characterization of the subunits of BAF (mSWI/SNF) chromatin remodeling complexes, and found that these complexes contribute to the cause of over 20% of human cancers and can act as either oncogenes or tumor suppressors, potentially opening a new avenue for treatment.

In 2013, Crabtree published "Our Fragile Intellect" in Trends in Genetics, The prediction that our intellectual abilities are genetically fragile was based on the determined rate of human de novo mutations (those mutations that appear in each generation). This rate has been determined in several human populations to be about 1.20×10^{−8} per nucleotide per generation with an average father's age of 29.7 years. This rate doubles every 16.5 years with the father's age and ascribes most of the new mutations to the father during the production of reproductive cells. Thus about 45 to 60 new mutations occur per generation per human genome with each new generation. The conclusion that the accumulation of these new mutations over the generations would lead to intellectual fragility was based on the estimate of the fraction of genes necessary for normal development of the nervous system, which is thought to be several thousand. The nervous system is unique in that an extraordinarily large number of genes are required for the development and function of the brain representing perhaps 10–20% of all human genes. The simple combination of the number of genes required for normal brain development (>1000) and the fact that each human generation has 45–60 new mutations per genome led Crabtree to suggest that our intellectual abilities are particularly genetically fragile over many generations.

== Selected awards ==
- NIH Director's Award, 1984
- Warner Lambert Park Davis Award, 1986
- Howard Hughes Investigator, 1988 to present
- Elected to the National Academy of Sciences, 1997
- Outstanding Inventor, Stanford University, 2004
- Thomas Scientific Laureate in Chemistry with Stuart Schreiber, 2006
- Stanford Faculty Mentor of the Year for 2008
- David Korn Professorship, 2008
- Jacob Javits Neuroscience Award, 2013

== Notable students and their current affiliation ==
Jorge Plutzky, Harvard University, Nikki Holbrook, Yale University; Katharine Ullman, University of Utah; Albert Fornace, Georgetown University; Calvin Kuo, Stanford University; Paul Khavari, Stanford University; Weidong Wang, National Institutes of Health; Keji Zhao, National Institutes of Health; Isabella Graef, Stanford University; Oliver Rando, University of Massachusetts; Paul J. Utz, Stanford University; Steve Biggar, Baker Brothers; C.P. Chang, Indiana University; Monte Winslow, Stanford University; Jason Gestwicki, University of California, San Francisco; Joe Arron, Genentech; Julie Lessard, University of Montreal; Jiang Wu, The University of Texas Southwestern Medical Center; Andrew Yoo, Washington University; Nate Hathaway, University of North Carolina; Oliver Bell, Research Institute of Molecular Pathology, Vienna; Diana Hargreaves, Salk Institute for Biological Studies; Emily Dykhuizen, Purdue University; Cigall Kadoch, Harvard University; Andrew Koh, University of Chicago; Simon Braun, University of Geneva, Switzerland; Courtney Hodges, Baylor College of Medicine;
