= Brian D. Strahl =

American biochemist and molecular biologist

Brian David Strahl
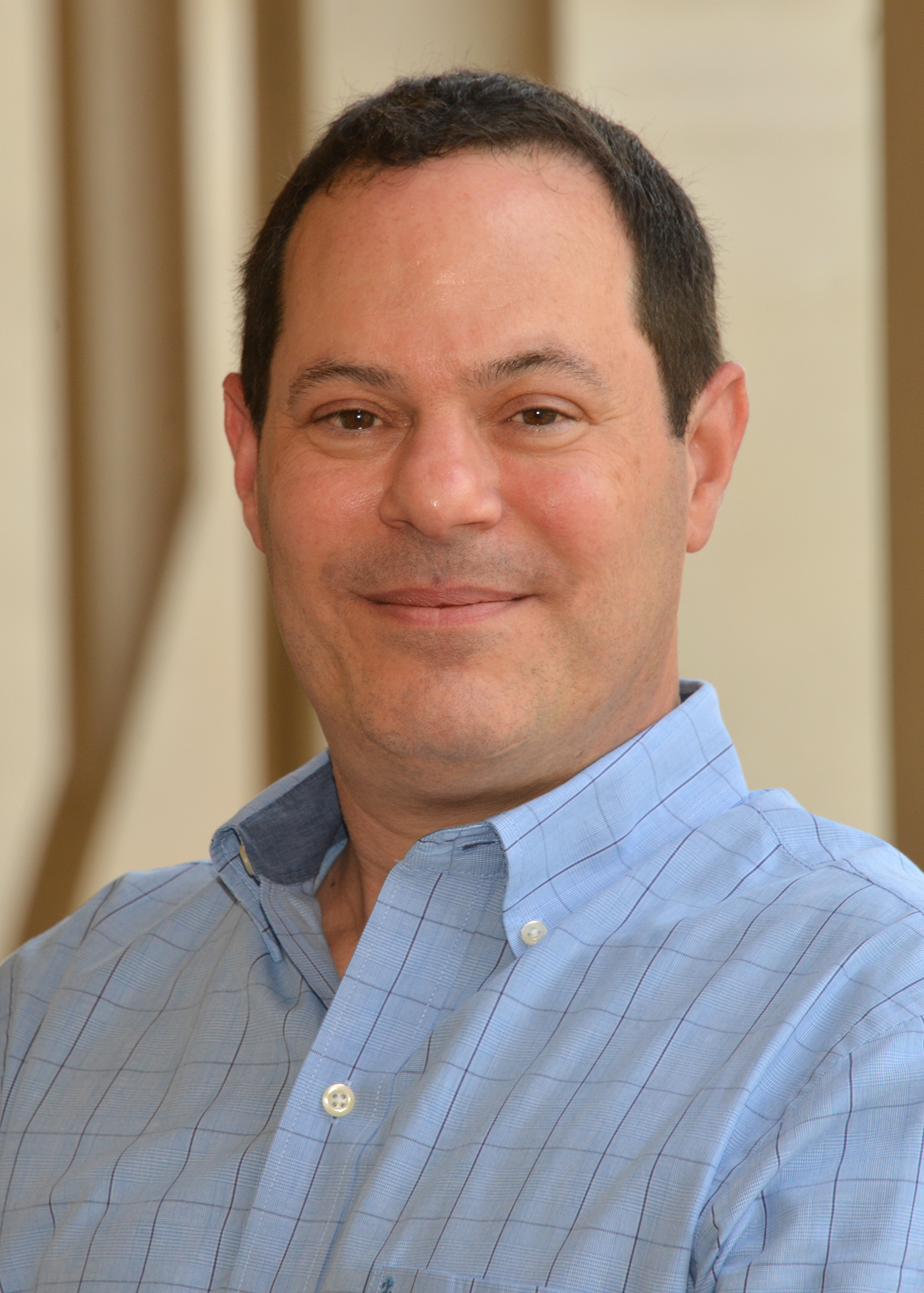
- Brian D. Strahl in 2024
- Born: 1970 (age 55–56)
- Known for: Histone code hypothesis & Research of histone modifications
- Scientific career
- Fields: Epigenetics
- Institutions: University of North Carolina at Chapel Hill
- Academic advisors: C. David Allis
- Website: https://strahl-lab.org/

Brian David Strahl (born 1970) is an American biochemist and molecular biologist. He is currently a professor in the Department of Biochemistry & Biophysics at the University of North Carolina at Chapel Hill. Strahl is known for his research in the field of chromatin biology and histone modifications. Strahl, with C. David Allis proposed the “histone code hypothesis”.

== Early life and education ==
Strahl was born in Buffalo, New York and raised in Albuquerque, New Mexico. He moved to Chapel Hill, North Carolina in 1980 when his father went to medical school at the University of North Carolina at Chapel Hill. Strahl entered the University of North Carolina at Greensboro in 1988, where he double majored in Chemistry and Biology. Strahl joined the Department of Biochemistry at North Carolina State University and received his PhD in 1998 under the supervision of Dr. William L. Miller. At North Carolina State University, Strahl defined mechanisms for how the Follicle-Stimulating Hormone-Beta (FSHß) gene is regulated at the transcriptional level. In 1998, Strahl performed postdoctoral studies under the mentorship of Dr. C. David Allis at the University of Virginia’s Department of Biochemistry and Molecular Genetics.

== Career ==
In 2001, Strahl joined the University of North Carolina at Chapel Hill as an assistant professor in the Department of Biochemistry and Biophysics. He was promoted to associate professor in 2008 and full professor in 2014. He also holds an appointment at UNC’s Lineberger Comprehensive Cancer Center and is a faculty member in the Curriculum in Genetics and Molecular Biology. Additionally, Strahl also serves as the faculty director of the UNC High-Throughput Peptide Synthesis and Array Core Facility From 2016 to 2020, he served as the Vice Chair of the Department of Biochemistry & Biophysics at UNC. From 2020 to 2022, he stepped into the role of Interim Chair of Biochemistry and Biophysics. Since 2023, Strahl has held the position of Assistant Dean for Research in the Office of Research at the University of North Carolina School of Medicine. The primary mission of the Office of Research is to develop and implement a strategic plan for research in the School of Medicine(reference). The UNC School of Medicine selected Strahl as an Oliver Smithies Investigator in recognition of his research contributions. This annual award recognizes senior faculty members who have gained international recognition for their work. Since 2015, Strahl has directed UNC's Program on Chromatin and Epigenetics, aiming to understand the complex language of epigenetic regulation. The program seeks to advance human health and address diseases. Stahl is also co-founder of EpiCypher, Inc. – a company known for services for chromatin biology and epigenetics research.

== Research and Discoveries ==
Strahl is a pioneer in the field of epigenetics, with contributions to the study of Chromatin biology. As a postdoctoral fellow in C. David Allis’ laboratory, helped to establish the identity of the first lysine and arginine histone methyltransferases and how they contribute to transcriptional activation and heterochromatin formation. Some examples include the discovery of the first histone methyltransferases that target lysine 4 (Set1), lysine 9 (SUV39H1), and lysine 36 of histone H3 (Set2/SETD2) and arginine 3 of histone H4 (PRMT1). Strahl also helped to develop the first antibodies for methylated histones in the Allis laboratory. In 2000, Strahl and Allis put forward the idea of the “histone code hypothesis”, which aimed to explain how multiple histone modifications function together to control chromatin structure and function. The early years of the Strahl laboratory, research focused on the roles of histone methylation and histone ubiquitylation in gene transcription. He linked histone H2B ubiquitylation to the regulation of H3 lysine 79 methylation and in transcriptional elongation and determined how H3 lysine 36 methylation is coupled to RNA Polymerase II and repressive chromatin during transcription elongation. His group also defined the key roles of several histone chaperones (e.g., Spt6) that function in transcription In more recent years, Strahl turned his attention to how chromatin-associated proteins engage histones and their modifications. Through the development of a peptide microarray platform, his group uncovered mechanisms of DNA methylation maintenance and defined modes of chromatin engagement by distinct families of histone-binding effector domains. Recent work has also turned to how recently defined effector domains, including the YEATS domain, contribute to chromatin function and metabolic transcription
