= KIF15 =

Protein-coding gene in the species Homo sapiens

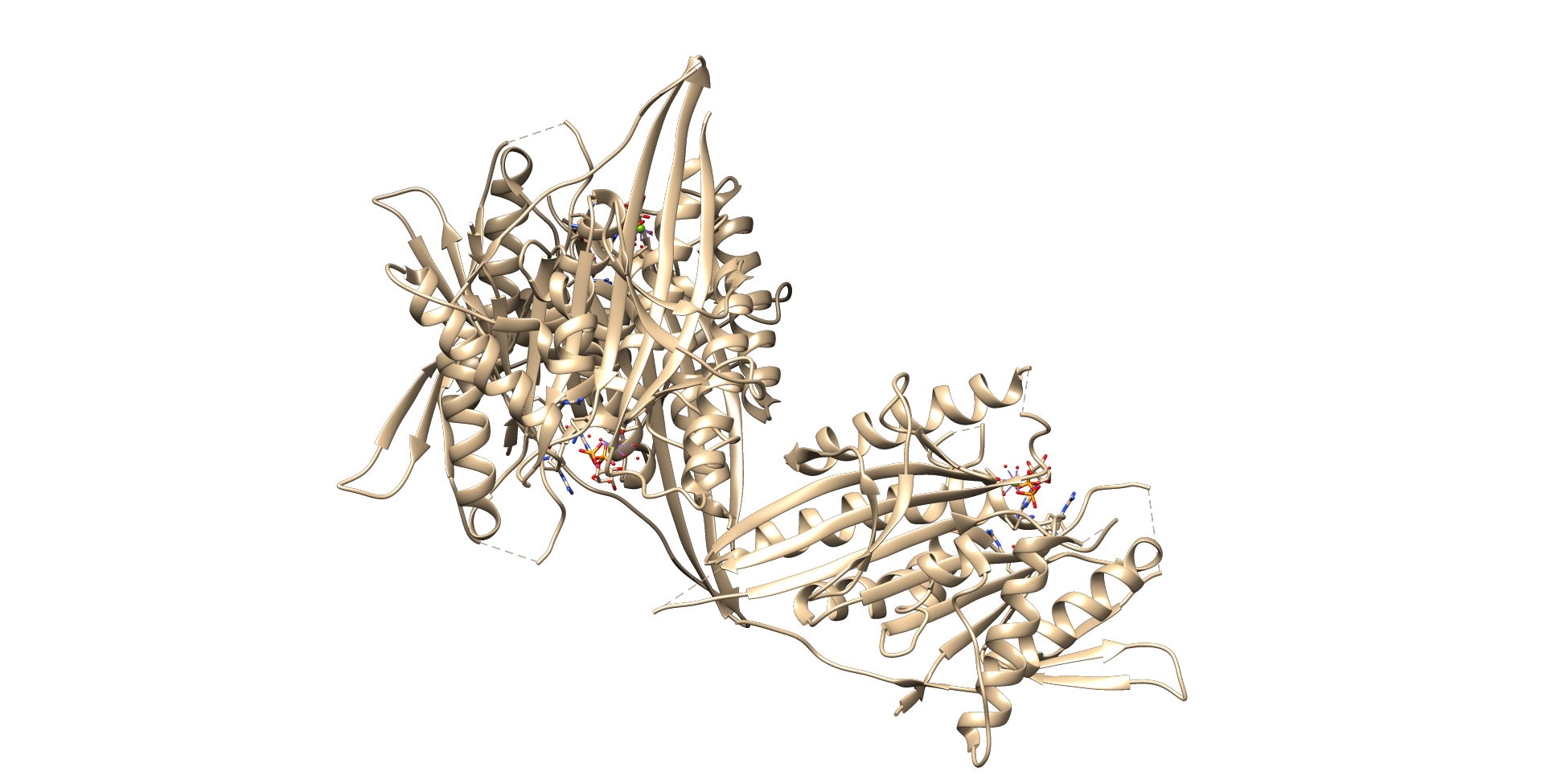

Identifiers
- Aliases: KIF15, HKLP2, KNSL7, NY-BR-62, kinesin family member 15, KLP2
- External IDs: OMIM: 617569; MGI: 1098258; GeneCards: KIF15
Available structures
PDB	Ortholog search: PDBe RCSB
PDB	List of PDB id codes 4BN2

Gene location (Human)
Chr.	Chromosome 3 (human)
Band	3p21.31	Start	44,761,721 bp
Band	3p21.31	End	44,873,376 bp

Gene location (Mouse)
Chr.	Chromosome 9 (mouse)
Band	9|9 F4	Start	122,780,111 bp
Band	9|9 F4	End	122,847,798 bp
RNA expression pattern
Bgee	Human / Mouse (ortholog); Top expressed in: ventricular zone; ganglionic eminence; left testis; right testis; testicle; gonad; bone marrow; mucosa of transverse colon; bone marrow cell; endometrium / Top expressed in: tail of embryo; genital tubercle; spermatocyte; ventricular zone; spermatid; embryo; yolk sac; embryo; blastocyst; morula; More reference expression data
BioGPS	n/a
Gene ontology
Molecular function	DNA binding; microtubule motor activity; nucleotide binding; microtubule binding; ATPase activity; cytoskeletal motor activity; ATP binding; protein binding
Cellular component	cytoplasm; cytosol; centrosome; membrane; spindle; plus-end kinesin complex; microtubule; cytoskeleton; kinesin complex
Biological process	antigen processing and presentation of exogenous peptide antigen via MHC class II; microtubule-based movement; cell population proliferation; retrograde vesicle-mediated transport, Golgi to endoplasmic reticulum; mitotic cell cycle
Sources:Amigo / QuickGO
Orthologs
Databases	NCBI: entry; OMA: entry
Species	Human	Mouse
Entrez	56992	209737
Ensembl	ENSG00000280610; ENSG00000163808	ENSMUSG00000036768
UniProt	Q9NS87	Q6P9L6
RefSeq (mRNA)	NM_020242	NM_010620
RefSeq (protein)	NP_064627	NP_034750
Location (UCSC)	Chr 3: 44.76 – 44.87 Mb	Chr 9: 122.78 – 122.85 Mb
PubMed search
- Wikidata
View/Edit Human	View/Edit Mouse

Kinesin family member 15 is a protein that in humans is encoded by the KIF15 gene.

This gene encodes a motor protein that is part of the kinesin superfamily. KIF15 maintains half spindle separation by opposing forces generated by other motor proteins. KIF15 co-localizes with microtubules and actin filaments in both dividing cells and in postmitotic neurons.

== Function ==
KIF15 (also known as Kinesin-12 and HKLP2) is a motor protein expressed in all cells during mitosis and in postmitotic neurons undergoing axon growth. KIF15 maintains bipolar microtubule spindle apparatus in dividing cells and shares redundant functions with KIF11. KIF15 is thought to promote spindle assembly by cross-linking and sliding along microtubules creating a separation between centrosomes. The microtubule localization of Kif15 is being regulated by Kinesin binding protein (KBP). HeLa cells depleted of KIF11, with reduced microtubule dynamics, are able to form bipolar spindles from acentrosomal asters in a KIF15 dependent manner. Hence, inhibition of KIF15 function will be a vital therapeutic approach in cancer chemotherapy. Since KIF11 and KIF15 are functionally redundant, drugs targeting both the proteins will be more potent.

== Function in neurons ==
KIF15 restricts the movement of short microtubules into growing axons by generating forces on microtubules which counteract those generated by cytoplasmic dynein. KIF15, together with KIF23 become enriched in dendrites as neurons mature to promote the transport of minus-end distal microtubules into nascent dendrites.

== Interactions ==
KIF15 has been shown to interact with TPX2. Both these dimers cooperate to slide along microtubules and maintain bipolar spindles.
