= Cigall Kadoch =

American biologist and entrepreneur

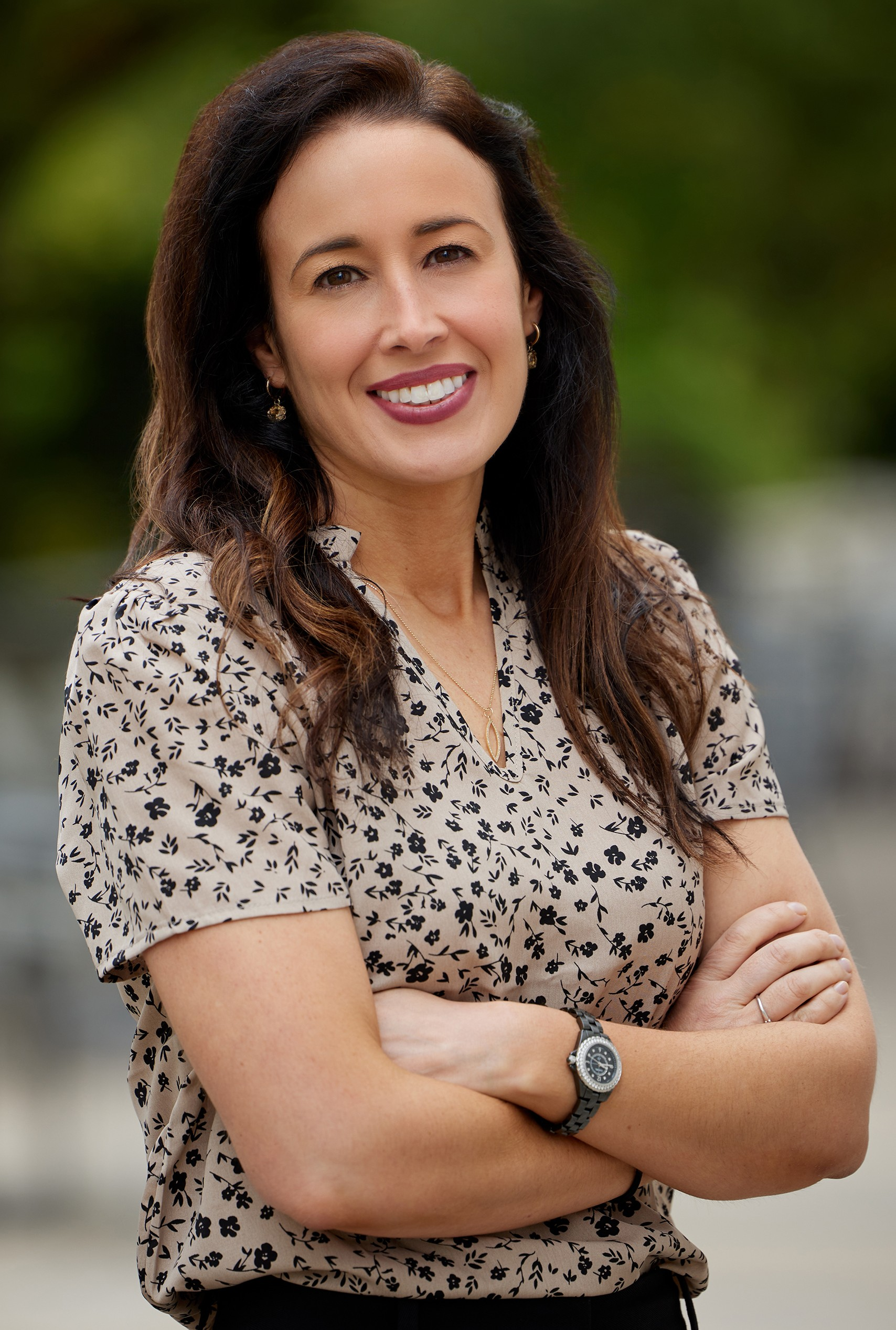
- Education: University of California, Berkeley (BS); Stanford University School of Medicine (PhD)
- Scientific career
- Workplaces: Harvard Medical School; Dana–Farber Cancer Institute; Broad Institute
- Thesis: ATP-dependent chromatin remodeling in human malignancy : identification and characterization of novel subunits of the mSWI/SNF-like BAF complex (2012)
- Website: Kadoch Lab

Cigall Kadoch is an American biochemist and cancer biologist who is a Professor and Meredith Beaton Starr and Billy Starr Investigator in the Department of Pediatric Oncology at the Dana–Farber Cancer Institute and Harvard Medical School and an Investigator at the Howard Hughes Medical Institute. Her research is focused in chromatin regulation and how changes in cellular structure can lead to human diseases, such as Cancer, Neurodevelopmental disorders, and others. She is internationally recognized for her work on the mammalian SWI/SNF complex, a large molecular machine known as a Chromatin remodeling complex. She was named as one of the world's leading scientists by MIT Technology Review, 35 Under 35 and Forbes 30 Under 30, and was named the Laureate in the Life Sciences for the Blavatnik National Awards for Young Scientists. In 2019, she received the Martin and Rose Wachtel Cancer Research Prize from the American Association for the Advancement of Science and in 2020, the American Association for Cancer Research Outstanding Achievement in Basic Cancer Research Award. Kadoch was also recognized as one of the 100 Most Influential Women in Oncology by OncoDaily.

== Early life and education ==
Kadoch was born and raised in Marin County, California, just north of San Francisco. As a teenager, she lost a close family friend to late-stage breast cancer, which inspired her to learn more about the disease. Kadoch eventually studied molecular and cellular biology at the University of California, Berkeley. She moved to Stanford University as a graduate student, where she specialized in cancer biology under the supervision of developmental biologist Gerald Crabtree. Her doctoral research considered chromatin remodeling in human malignancy. Whilst completing her doctorate, she identified a relationship between the SWI/SNF (BAF) chromatin remodeling protein complex and synovial sarcoma. After completing her doctorate at Stanford University she transitioned directly to faculty at Dana–Farber Cancer Institute and Harvard Medical School.

== Research and career ==
In 2014, at the age of 28, Kadoch established her independent laboratory at the Dana–Farber Cancer Institute and Harvard Medical School, as an assistant professor. She was one of the youngest faculty members to achieve such status. She has since studied mammalian SWI/SNF complexes in an effort to develop new therapeutic strategies.

The SWI/SNF complexes serve to open and close DNA, altering which genes are expressed at particular times. Kadoch's work showed that mutations in the SWI/SNF (BAF) protein complex are involved in over 20% of human cancers. Further, Kadoch identified that 100% of synovial sarcoma tumors have defects in one particular subunit of SWI/SNF complex, which drives disease pathogenesis. The fusion oncoprotein subunit, SS18-SSX, appears to break the guidance system of SWI/SNF (BAF), targeting it aberrantly on chromatin and activating genes that support cancer development. In lab-based experiments, Kadoch showed that it was possible to use healthy subunits to repair the complex and kill the cancerous cells.

In 2016, Kadoch's research resulted in the formation of Foghorn Therapeutics, a biotechnology company that seeks to build novel therapeutic strategies based on the chromatin regulatory system. The spin-out company launched on the Nasdaq in 2020, with a $120 million initial public offering.

== Awards and honors ==
- NIH Director's New Innovator Award
- Pew Scholar Award
- American Cancer Society Research Scholar Award
- American Association for the Advancement of Sciences Marin and Rose Wachtel Cancer Research Prize
- American Association for Cancer Research Outstanding Achievement Award
- American Society for Cell Biology Early Career Life Scientist Award
- Forbes 30 under 30 List
- MIT Technology Review 35 Innovators Under 35
- Popular Science Brilliant 10
- Business Insider Top 30 Young leaders in Biopharma
- Blavatnik National Awards Finalist

== Selected publications ==
- Cigall Kadoch; Diana C Hargreaves; Hodges, Courtney; Laura Elias; Lena Ho; Jeff Ranish; Crabtree, Gerald (2013). "Proteomic and bioinformatic analysis of mammalian SWI/SNF complexes identifies extensive roles in human malignancy". Nature Genetics. 45 (6): 592–601. doi:10.1038/ng.2628. PMC 3667980. PMID 23644491. Wikidata Q34342958.
- Cigall Kadoch; Crabtree, Gerald (2015). "Mammalian SWI/SNF chromatin remodeling complexes and cancer: Mechanistic insights gained from human genomics". Science Advances. 1 (5) e1500447. doi:10.1126/sciadv.1500447. PMC 4640607. PMID 26601204. Wikidata Q26776098.
- Cigall Kadoch; Crabtree, Gerald (2013). "Reversible disruption of mSWI/SNF (BAF) complexes by the SS18-SSX oncogenic fusion in synovial sarcoma". Cell. 153 (1): 71–85. doi:10.1016/j.cell.2013.02.036. PMC 3655887. PMID 23540691. Wikidata Q24337483.
