= Paul Khavari =

Carl J. Hezrog Professor at the Stanford University School of Medicine

Paul A. Khavari is the Carl J. Herzog Professor at the Stanford University School of Medicine and the Founding Co-Director of the Stanford Program in Epithelial Biology. He is an elected member of the National Academy of Medicine.

The Khavari Laboratory uses multiomic and computational approaches to study stem cell differentiation, cancer, and the genomics of common polygenic human diseases.

== Education ==
Khavari studied biology and history at Stanford University then earned an MD at Yale School of Medicine. He did research at the Brigham and Women's Hospital and Harvard Medical School before undertaking Dermatology residency training at Yale. He completed PhD studies in the laboratory of Gerald Crabtree at the Stanford University School of Medicine.

== Academic career ==
Khavari joined the Stanford faculty in 1993, and began service as Chief of Dermatology at the VA Palo Alto Healthcare System. In 1999, he co-founded the Stanford Program in Epithelial Biology with Dr. Tony Oro and has served as Co-Director since. In 2010, he was appointed Chair of the Stanford University School of Medicine Department of Dermatology, a leading dermatology department globally. He was one of three Stanford faculty members elected to the Institute of Medicine (now National Academy of Medicine) in 2014.

Research in the Khavari laboratory focuses on genome regulation, signaling, noncoding RNAs, and innovating new human tissue genetic models, with a special focus on the cutaneous epidermis. The lab accomplished the first genetic corrections of human skin tissue, defined the minimal oncogenic gene set needed to transform normal human tissues into cancer, and identified the kinetics of human malignant transformation using novel human tissue cancer models. The Khavari group also identified new essential roles for a number of regulators in epidermal homeostasis, including ZNF750, MAF, MAFB, PRMT1, CSNK1A1, EHF, MPZL3, FDXR, TINCR, and ACTL6A. It uncovered new regulators and effectors of Ras GTPases, including small noncoding snoRNAs as direct Ras-binders that modulate its function and mTORC2 as a new direct Ras downstream effector critical for the pro-proliferation impacts of Ras signaling. The lab defined two major classes of genomic enhancers in dynamic gene regulation and used multiomics and deep learning approaches to decode the combinatorial cis-regulatory DNA motif lexicon that drives epidermal differentiation. The lab has innovated a number of technologies, including single cell perturb-ATAC-seq, RNA protein interaction detection (RAPID), RNA-protein microarray hybridization, and mosaic human skin tissue models. In cancer studies, the Khavari lab identified and characterized tumor specific keratinocytes in cutaneous squamous cell cancer, characterized a new tumor suppressor pathway, and defined a new sunlight induced oncogene in skin cancer.

Recently, the Khavari laboratory uncovered a new role for free glucose and other endogenous biomolecules in novel functions, including control of RNA lifecycles and genome regulation via regulation of protein oligomerization. Additionally, the lab developed a new way to identify protein assemblies on single RNA molecules, revealing a new functional code for RNA binding protein modulation of RNA lifecycles in homeostasis and cancer. Global characterization of the proteome during stem cell differentiation elucidated the existence of a molecular rheostat controlling stem cell fate mediated by dynamic antagonism of NEDD8 and SUMO2 ubiquitin-like proteins.

== Selected Honors and Awards ==
Khavari has received a number of honors and awards, including most recently the Stephan Rothman Memorial Award, the highest award given by the Society of Investigative Dermatology.

2021 Stephen Rothman Memorial Award, Society for Investigative Dermatology

2018 Kligman-Frost Leadership Award, Society for Investigative Dermatology

2016 Lila & Murray Gruber Cancer Research Award, American Academy of Dermatology

2014 National Academy of Medicine

2012 American Skin Association 25th Anniversary Lifetime Scientific Achievement Award

2009 American Association of Physicians

2008 Tanioku Kihei Memorial Award, Japanese Society for Investigative Dermatology

2004 Marion B. Sulzberger Memorial Award, American Academy of Dermatology

2004 William Montagna Award, Society for Investigative Dermatology

1999 American Society for Clinical Investigation

1998 HHMI Junior Faculty Scholar Award, Stanford University

1997 V.A. Young Investigator Award, V.A. Palo Alto Health Care System

1996 U.S. Presidential Early Career Award for Scientists and Engineers

1995 Shannon Award, National Institutes of Health

== Notable Trainees and their current Affiliation ==
- Xiaomin Bao, Northwestern
- Aparna Bhaduri, UCLA
- Lisa Boxer, NIH
- Yonglu Che, Stanford
- Jennifer Chen, Stanford
- Keith Choate, Yale
- Min Fang, University of Washington
- Andrew Ji, Mount Sinai
- Joanna Kovalski, University of North Carolina, Chapel Hill
- Markus Kretz, University of Regensburg
- Yoshi Kubo, University of Tokushima
- Carolyn Lee, University of Virginia
- Susana Ortiz-Urda, UCSF
- Kun Qu, USTC
- Todd Ridky, University of Pennsylvania
- Eon Rios, Stanford
- Kavita Sarin, Stanford
- Cornelia Seitz, Goettingen
- George Sen, UCSD
- Zurab Siprashvili, Stanford
- Bryan Sun, UCSD
- Masahito Tarutani, Tokyo University
- Jennifer Zhang, Duke
