= COMPASS complex =

Protein complex

Complex Proteins Associated with Set1, also known as COMPASS, is a conserved protein complex playing a major role as a H3K4me3 methylase in eukaryotes. Since it was first identified in 2001, other members of the COMPASS family of methylases with different functions have been discovered, in particular in humans.

The COMPASS complex, or similar protein complexes, have been identified in species ranging from single-celled fungi to humans. They play an important regulatory role in many essential biological processes including DNA repair, the progression of the cell cycle, and transcription through the methylenation of histone lysines.

The COMPASS complex is an example of a trithorax-group protein. The MLL1/SET domain associated with the COMPASS complex have crystal structure. The gene Cps50 coordinates the construction of COMPASS.
