= Arena BioWorks =

Biomedical research company in Cambridge

- Founded: January 12, 2024
- Founder: Stuart Schreiber
- Type: Private biomedical research institute
- Headquarters: 399 Binney Street, Kendall Square, Cambridge, Massachusetts, United States
- Key people: Stuart Schreiber (CEO), Steve Pagliuca (Executive Chair), Tom Cahill (Managing Director)
- Funding: $500 million (private)
- Website: arenabio.works

Arena BioWorks was a privately funded, for‑profit biomedical research institute in Kendall Square, Cambridge, Massachusetts. Launched in January, 2024, it sought to shorten the path from biological insight to therapeutic development by combining basic research and company creation under one roof. It closed in November 2025.

== History ==
The origins of Arena BioWorks go back to early 2020, when cofounder Stuart Schreiber and a group called “Scientists to Stop COVID‑19” coordinated efforts to accelerate vaccine and therapeutic development during the SARS‑CoV‑2 pandemic, inspiring the concept of applying “warp‑speed” strategies to other diseases. Following more than two years of planning, the institute operated in stealth mode beginning mid‑2023 at 399 Binney Street with approximately 50 scientists before its public unveiling on January 12, 2024.

== Governance and funding ==
Arena BioWorks is governed by a management committee comprising Stuart Schreiber (CEO), Steve Pagliuca (executive chair), and Tom Cahill (managing director of Newpath Partners). The institute was capitalized with $500 million in private funding from investors including Pagliuca, Michael Dell, Michael Chambers, Jim Breyer, and Elisabeth DeLuca. Investors receive up to 30 percent of profits from spin‑out companies, with remaining proceeds allocated to scientist compensation, operations, and an endowment for future research.

== Location and facilities ==
The institute is headquartered at 399 Binney Street in Kendall Square, near research organizations such as the Broad Institute, Whitehead Institute, Koch Institute, and McGovern Institute for Brain Research.

== Scientific model and approach ==
Arena BioWorks employs a staff‑scientist model that decouples research from academic training, offering permanent positions rather than relying on graduate students or postdoctoral fellows. The institute integrates discovery with in‑house company formation, aiming to streamline translation of basic research into therapeutic candidates.

== Leadership ==
- Stuart Schreiber, chemical biologist and Harvard University professor, is chief executive officer.
- Steve Pagliuca is the executive chair of the board.
- Tom Cahill (entrepreneur) represents venture interests on the management committee.

== Scientific team ==
The core scientific leadership includes J. Keith Joung, an innovator in CRISPR technology who joined from Massachusetts General Hospital as lead translator.

== Research focus and platforms ==
Arena BioWorks focuses on disease‑agnostic strategy, brain health, oncology, immunology, and aging based on genetic and mechanistic insights. The institute’s platform technologies include small‑molecule and protein therapeutic discovery, chemoproteomics, molecular glues, covalent drug design, high‑throughput screening, protein and antibody engineering, gene and epigenetic editing, cell and gene therapies, biomanufacturing, and data science.

== Reception and criticism ==
Commentators have likened Arena BioWorks to the “Bell Labs of Biotech,” citing its for‑profit model and expansive funding as an experimental approach to translational research. Critics have raised concerns that lucrative compensation packages may create a “brain drain” from academic institutions, potentially undermining the training and mentorship of future scientists. Others, including MIT’s Robert Langer, have argued that nonprofit and for‑profit research entities can coexist, each contributing to advances in human health.

== Collaborations ==
The Broad Institute has signaled interest in exploring collaborative research opportunities with Arena BioWorks, recognizing potential synergies between nonprofit and for‑profit science communities in Kendall Square.
