= Tim Mitchison =

Tim Mitchison FRS
- Born: Timothy John Mitchison; 1958 (age 67–68); Edinburgh
- Education: Haberdashers' Aske's Boys' School
- Alma mater: University of Oxford (BA); University of California, San Francisco (PhD)
- Spouse: Christine M. Field
- Awards: Haldane Lecture (2002); Keith R. Porter Lecture (2013)
- Scientific career
- Fields: Systems biology
- Institutions: Harvard Medical School; National Institute for Medical Research; Marine Biological Laboratory
- Thesis: Structure and Dynamics of Organized Microtubule Arrays (1984)
- Doctoral advisor: Marc Kirschner
- Notable students: Tony Hyman; Julie Theriot; Jason Swedlow; Inke Nathke; Katharina Ribbeck
- Website: mitchison.hms.harvard.edu/people/timothy-mitchison

Timothy John Mitchison FRS is a cell biologist and systems biologist and Hasib Sabbagh Professor of Systems Biology at Harvard Medical School in the United States. He is known for his discovery, with Marc Kirschner, of dynamic instability in microtubules, for studies of the mechanism of cell division, and for contributions to chemical biology.

== Education and early life ==
Mitchison was educated at Haberdashers' Aske's Boys' School and completed his Bachelor of Arts degree in Biochemistry at the University of Oxford where he was an undergraduate student of Merton College, Oxford, from 1976 to 1979. He moved to the University of California, San Francisco (UCSF) in 1979 for his PhD which was supervised by Marc Kirschner and investigated the dynamic instability of microtubules.

== Career and research ==
Mitchison returned to the UK for postdoctoral research at the National Institute for Medical Research (NIMR) in London. In 1988 he returned to San Francisco where he was appointed assistant professor at UCSF. In 1994 he wrote an opinion piece for the journal Chemistry & Biology titled "Towards a pharmacological genetics" which helped to launch the field of chemical genetics. In 1997 he moved to Harvard University to become co-director of the Institute for Chemistry and Cell Biology at Harvard Medical School, where he pioneered phenotype-based screening, discovering the small molecule monastrol – the first small-molecule inhibitor of mitosis that does not target tubulin. Monastrol was shown to inhibit kinesin-5, a motor protein. In 2003 he became Deputy Chair of the newly formed Department of Systems Biology, chaired by Marc Kirschner. He works on aspects of mesoscale biology including the self-organization of the cytoskeleton and of cytoplasm. He collaborates extensively with Christine Field on the mechanism of cytokinesis.

=== Awards and honors ===
Mitchison was elected Fellow of the Royal Society (FRS) in 1997 for "substantial contributions to the improvement of natural knowledge" and served as president of the American Society for Cell Biology (ASCB) in 2010. He was elected a member of the National Academy of Sciences of the United States in 2014 and delivered the Keith R. Porter Lecture in 2013.

== Personal life ==
Mitchison is married to scientist Christine M. Field with whom he has two children. Mitchison comes from a family of distinguished biologists; his father is Avrion Mitchison, his uncles are Denis Mitchison and Murdoch Mitchison, his great uncle was J.B.S. Haldane and his great-grandfather John Scott Haldane. His grandparents were the politician Dick Mitchison and the writer Naomi Mitchison (née Haldane). His younger sister Hannah M. Mitchison is also a biologist.
