= Michael T. McManus (biologist) =

American biologist

- Education: Auburn University (B.S.), University of Alabama at Birmingham (Ph.D.), Massachusetts Institute of Technology (postdoc)
- Known for: RNA interference, microRNA research, gene regulation
- Awards: WM Keck Award, NIH Transformative Research Award, Robert J. Kleberg, Jr. and Helen C. Kleberg Award
- Scientific career
- Fields: Synthetic Biology, Immunology, RNA Biology
- Workplaces: University of California, San Francisco
- Academic advisors: Stephen L. Hajduk, Phillip A. Sharp

Michael T. McManus is an American professor of Microbiology and Immunology at the University of California, San Francisco (UCSF), where he holds the Vincent and Stella Coates Endowed Chair. He directs the Keck Center for Noncoding RNAs and the UCSF ViraCore facility. His research areas include RNA biology, gene regulation, immunology, and high-throughput screening. McManus serves as an Investigator at the Chan Zuckerberg Biohub.

== Early life and education ==
Michael T. McManus earned his Bachelor of Science (B.S.) in Horticultural Science from Auburn University in 1991. He completed his Ph.D. in Biochemistry and Molecular Genetics at the University of Alabama at Birmingham in 2000, under the mentorship of Dr. Stephen L. Hajduk. His doctoral research involved identifying mitochondrial RNA editing ligases from Trypanosoma brucei, providing support for an enzymatic model for insertional/deletional RNA editing.

He then conducted postdoctoral research in mammalian RNA interference (RNAi) and microRNA at the Massachusetts Institute of Technology (MIT) under Nobel Laureate Phillip A. Sharp. where he provided early evidence of small interfering RNA (siRNA)-mediated gene silencing in primary cells. In 2002, McManus and colleagues reported on the development of short hairpin RNA techniques, contributing to the field of gene silencing and lentiviral delivery systems.

== Career ==
McManus began started as an assistant professor at UCSF in the Department of Microbiology and Immunology and the UCSF Diabetes Center. He became a full professor in 2016, holding the Vincent and Stella Coates Endowed Chair

He is the director of the Keck Center for Noncoding RNAs and the core director of the UCSF ViraCore facility. Since 2022, Dr. McManus has served as an investigator at the Chan Zuckerberg Biohub. He is also a member of the UCSF Helen Diller Family Comprehensive Cancer Center and has held memberships at the Innovative Genomics Institute and the Eli & Edythe Broad Center for Regeneration Medicine and Stem Cell Research. His work involves computational and synthetic biology approaches to study human disease, particularly through gene regulation and high-throughput screening techniques.

== Research contributions ==
McManus's research has encompassed the development of RNA interference technologies, including shRNA methodologies, and the application of deep sequencing in high-throughput gene perturbation screens. Notable contributions include:

- Developed RNA interference and shRNA technologies
- Developed deep sequencing methods to analyze high-throughput gene perturbation screens, now a standard method in the field.
- Investigated the role of noncoding RNAs and epigenetic regulation, identifying mechanisms in development and disease.
- Developed the first CRISPR interference (CRISPRi) mouse model, thereby enabling rapid and efficient gene suppression in vivo.
- Developed high-throughput methods to study genetic epistasis and determine biological pathway directionality.
- Discovered that drug-tolerant persister cancer cells are vulnerable to GPX4 inhibition, identifying a potential therapeutic strategy for targeting drug resistant cancer cells.

== Awards and honors ==
In 2006, McManus received the WM Keck Award for establishing a Center for Noncoding RNAs. In 2014, he received the NIH Transformative Research Award for his project on tracing cell lineages, focusing on developing high-throughput lineage tracing technologies. In 2019, he received the Robert J. Kleberg, Jr. and Helen C. Kleberg Award for his work on engineering cell-based mRNA delivery therapies. Additional honors are detailed on his university's official website.
