= Set1 =

Set1 is a gene that codes for Histone-lysine N-methyltransferase and H3 lysine-4 specific proteins (H3K). Set1 proteins can also be referred to as COMPASS proteins. The first H3K4 methylase, Saccharomyces cerevisiae Set1/COMPASS, is highly conserved across a multitude of phylogenies. The histone methylation facilitated by Set1 is required for cell growth and transcription silencing through the repression of RNA polymerase II. The Set1C, COMPASS Complex, also aids in transcription elongation regulation and the maintenance of telomere length.
