= Diana Hargreaves =

American biologist

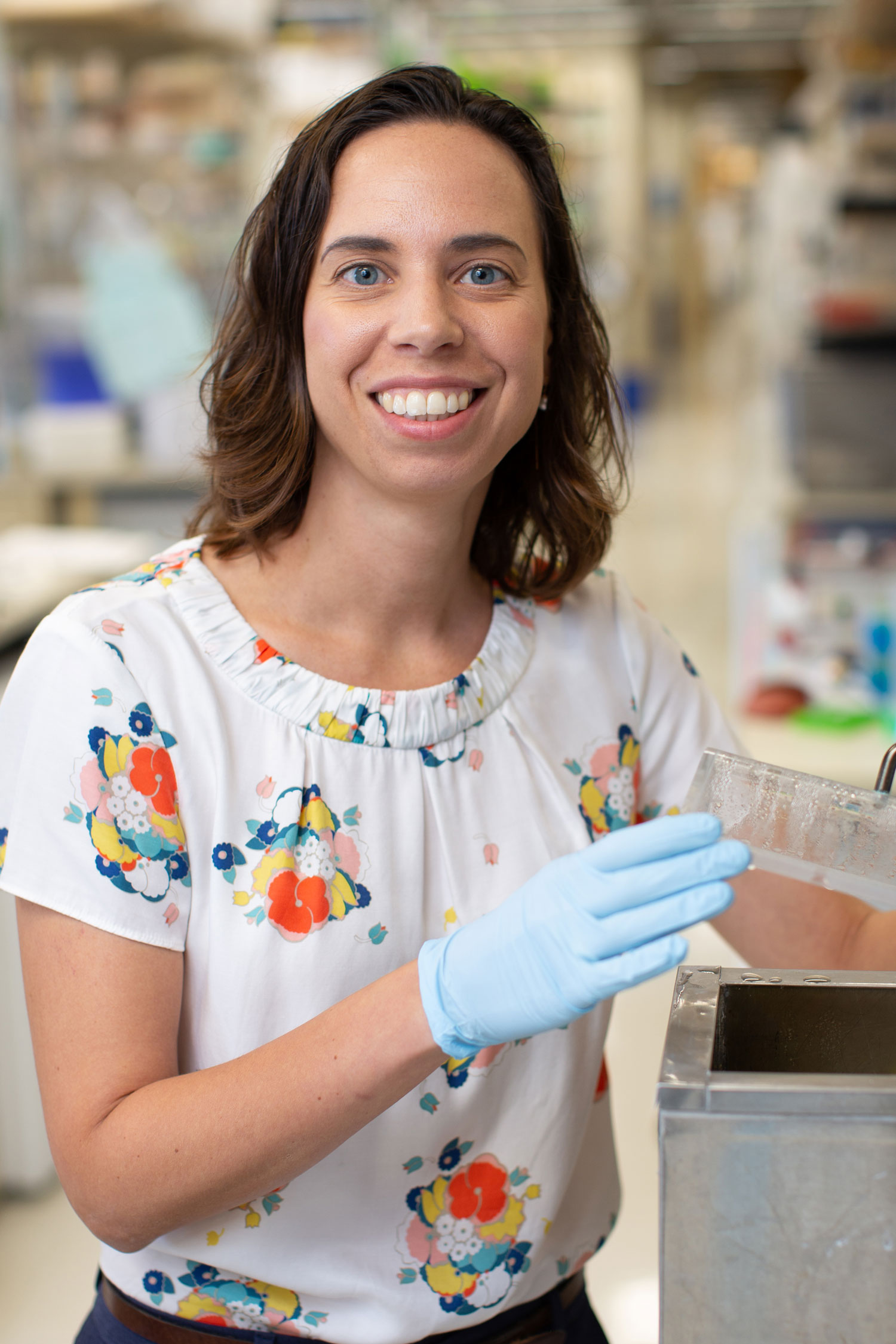
- Education: Haverford College, Yale University
- Known for: studies on BAF complex
- Scientific career
- Workplaces: Salk Institute for Biological Sciences
- Website: https://www.salk.edu/scientist/diana-hargreaves/

Diana Hargreaves is an American biologist and associate professor at The Salk Institute for Biological Studies and member of The Salk Cancer Center. Her laboratory focuses on epigenetic regulation by the BAF (SWI/SNF) chromatin remodeling complexes in diverse physiological processes including development, immunity, and diseases such as cancer.

== Early life and education ==
Hargreaves completed her Bachelor of Science in Chemistry at Haverford College, a leading liberal arts college in Haverford Pennsylvania. Hargreaves obtained her PhD in Immunology at Yale University where she studied in the lab of Ruslan Medzhitov, a leader in the field of innate immunity and pathogen recognition. Her thesis focused on the epigenetic signatures following pathogen recognition by innate immune cells such as macrophages.

== Career and research ==
Following the completion of her Doctoral work, Hargreaves joined the lab of Dr. Gerald Crabtree where she and others uncovered that the genes encoding subunits of the BAF Chromatin remodelling subunits are mutated in ~20% of all human cancers and uncovered mechanisms of BAF complex tumor suppression. Hargreaves was appointed professorship at the Salk Institute for Biological Studies in 2015 where she continues her focus on the chromatin remodelling complex BAF. Her lab has recently discovered a specific subunit of BAF that is responsible for maintaining cellular pluripotency, an unbiased differentiation state. Hargreaves' work holds potential in the realm of regenerative medicine for use in treating tissue damage and disease. Hargreaves also investigates epigenetic chromatin remodelling with a goal of identifying therapeutic targets that harness the immune system to defend against tumors.

== Awards and honors ==
- 2019 Pew-Stewart Scholar for Cancer Research
- 2016–2018 V Foundation Scholar Award, V Foundation for Cancer Research
- 2014–2018 K99/R00 Pathway to Independence Award, National Cancer Institute/National Institutes of Health
- 2013–2014 Ann Schreiber Research Training Program of Excellence Grantee, Ovarian Cancer Research Fund
- 2010–2013 Postdoctoral Fellowship, Helen Hay Whitney Foundation
- 2002–2005 Graduate Fellowship, National Science Foundation

== Publications ==
- Foster SL, Hargreaves DC, Medzhitov R. Gene-specific control of inflammation by TLR-induced chromatin modifications. Nature. 2007 Jun 21;447(7147):972-8. Epub 2007 May 30. Erratum in: Nature. 2008 Jan 3;451(7174):102. PMID 17538624
- Hargreaves DC, Horng T, Medzhitov R. Control of inducible gene expression by signal-dependent transcriptional elongation. Cell. 2009 Jul 10;138(1):129-45. doi: 10.1016/j.cell.2009.05.047. PMID 19596240
- Kadoch C, Hargreaves DC, Hodges C, Elias L, Ho L, Ranish J, Crabtree GR. Proteomic and bioinformatic analysis of mammalian SWI/SNF complexes identifies extensive roles in human malignancy. Nat Genet. 2013 Jun;45(6):592-601. doi: 10.1038/ng.2628. Epub 2013 May 5.
- Kelso TWR, Porter DK, Amaral ML, Shokhirev MN, Benner C, Hargreaves DC. Chromatin accessibility underlies synthetic lethality of SWI/SNF subunits in ARID1A-mutant cancers. Elife. 2017 Oct 2;6. pii: e30506. doi: 10.7554/eLife.30506.
- Gatchalian J, Malik S, Ho J, Lee DS, Kelso TWR, Shokhirev MN, Dixon JR, Hargreaves DC. A non-canonical BRD9-containing BAF chromatin remodeling complex regulates naive pluripotency in mouse embryonic stem cells. . Nat Commun. 2018 Dec 3;9(1):5139. doi: 10.1038/s41467-018-07528-9. PMID 30510198
- Gao F, Elliott NJ, Ho J, Sharp A, Shokhirev MN, Hargreaves DC. Heterozygous Mutations in SMARCA2 Reprogram the Enhancer Landscape by Global Retargeting of SMARCA4. Mol Cell. 2019 Sep 5;75(5):891-904.e7. doi: 10.1016/j.molcel.2019.06.024. Epub 2019 Jul 30. PMID 31375262
