= Albert J. Fornace Jr. =

American professor

Albert J. Fornace Jr. (born 1949) is a professor in the departments of Oncology, Biochemistry and Molecular & Cellular Biology, and Radiation Medicine at Georgetown University. He has also been awarded the Molecular Cancer Research Chair at Lombardi Comprehensive Cancer Center, joining Georgetown in 2006 from the Harvard School of Public Health. Earlier, he was chief of the Gene Response Section at the National Cancer Institute. He graduated from La Salle College High School in Philadelphia, Pennsylvania (1967), and received his B.S. (1970) and M.D. (1972) from the Jefferson-Penn State joint pre-medical/medical program.

== Research career ==
Fornace has made a variety of notable discoveries in the fields of cancer research, molecular biology, radiation biology, and toxicology with particular emphasis on understanding stress-signaling mechanisms in both normal and cancer cells. This has focused on understanding how cells and organisms respond to genotoxic (DNA damaging) agents, such as radiation, that can cause cancer – as well as being used for its treatment. He was one of the first to show that human and other mammalian cells can respond at the gene level to genotoxic stress, and isolated many of the first known DNA-damage-inducible genes. This included the GADD45A gene and other members of the GADD (growth-arrest and DNA-damage inducible) group.

His laboratory went on to show that many of these genes have roles in growth control, DNA repair, and resistance to cancer, and he has had made important contributions in the characterization of pathways (such as TP53) involved in these critical cellular processes. He has been a pioneer in the use of genomic and metabolomic approaches to understand system-wide effects of damaging agents like radiation. In the case of metabolomics, Fornace is the founding director of the Waters Center of Innovation at Georgetown University in 2011, and the Center for Metabolomic Studies at Georgetown University Medical Center in 2019.

Many of Fornace's studies have used ionizing and UV radiation as model stress agents. These studies also have practical implications for health risks of radiation, assessment of radiation injury, as well as cancer treatment. Since 2010, he has directed a NASA Specialized Center of Research to assess cancer risk during long-term space missions.

Earlier studies focused on DNA repair and DNA recombination. Using sensitive DNA strand break assays in human cells, he was the first to show scission events by nucleotide excision repair, as well as recombination of chromosomal DNA containing damaged DNA. While in Dr. Jerry Crabtree’s laboratory, he elucidated a type of common regional genetic duplication event that occurs over an evolutionary time scale in humans.

Fornace has more than 430 publications with over 57,000 citations (Google Scholar), and received a Molecular Biology Leader Award from Research.com: Ranking of Top Scientists in the field of Molecular Biology (92 nd US, 140 th world), 2024 Edition. He has mentored many research fellows and students who have gone on to successful scientific careers. While at the NIH he received a variety of awards including the Public Health Service Outstanding Service Medal. At Georgetown University he received the Medical Center Leadership in Research Award. In the radiation field he has received multiple awards including the Radiation Research Society Excellence in Mentoring Award as well as the Failla Award of the Radiation Research Society, which is the annual career award to an outstanding member of the radiation research community in recognition of a history of major contributions to the field. In 2020, he was elected a Fellow in the National Academy of Inventors (NAI).
