= Filanesib =

Names
- Preferred IUPAC name (2S)-2-(3-Aminopropyl)-5-(2,5-difluorophenyl)-N-methoxy-N-methyl-2-phenyl-1,3,4-thiadiazole-3(2H)-carboxamide
- Other names ARRY-520

Identifiers
CAS Number	885060-09-3
3D model (JSmol)	Interactive image
ChemSpider	25069697
KEGG	D11754
PubChem CID	44224257
UNII	8A49OSO368
CompTox Dashboard (EPA)	DTXSID50237086
- InChI: InChI=1S/C20H22F2N4O2S/c1-25(28-2)19(27)26-20(11-6-12-23,14-7-4-3-5-8-14)29-18(24-26)16-13-15(21)9-10-17(16)22/h3-5,7-10,13H,6,11-12,23H2,1-2H3/t20-/m0/s1 Key: LLXISKGBWFTGEI-FQEVSTJZSA-N
- SMILES: CN(C(=O)N1[C@](SC(=N1)C2=C(C=CC(=C2)F)F)(CCCN)C3=CC=CC=C3)OC

Properties
Chemical formula	C_{20}H_{22}F_{2}N_{4}O_{2}S
Molar mass	420.48 g·mol^{−1}
- Except where otherwise noted, data are given for materials in their standard state (at 25 °C [77 °F], 100 kPa). Infobox references

Filanesib (code name ARRY-520) is a kinesin spindle protein (KIF11) inhibitor which has recently been proposed as a cancer treatment, specifically for multiple myeloma.

== History of research ==
In 2009, two in vitro studies on the effects of filanesib on either ovarian cancer cells or acute myeloid leukemia cells were published. The former reported that filanesib "...has similar anti-tumor activity in EOC [epithelial ovarian cancer] cells as that of paclitaxel. However, unlike paclitaxel, it does not induce these pro-tumor effects in Type I cells." The detrimental effects attributed to paclitaxel were alleged to be "...due to paclitaxel-induced enhancement of NF-κB and ERK activities, and cytokine production (e.g. IL-6), which promote chemoresistance and tumor progression." The latter study also reported promising results, concluding that filanesib "...potently induces cell cycle block and subsequent death in leukemic cells via the mitochondrial pathway and has the potential to eradicate AML [acute myeloid leukemia] progenitor cells." However, a clinical trial published in 2012 on patients with advanced myeloid leukemias found that the drug exhibited a "relative lack of clinical activity"; the trial was therefore halted before it was scheduled to end.

In June 2013, preliminary results from a trial of the drug were presented at a conference of the European Hematology Association in Stockholm. On October 31, 2013, it was reported that the company which developed the drug, Array BioPharma (based in Boulder, Colorado), was planning on launching a phase III clinical trial of the drug to treat multiple myeloma. The study began in mid-2014, and paired filanesib with the proteasome inhibitor carfilzomib in several hundred patients. The study's primary endpoint was progression-free survival (i.e. the time until the cancer recurs). A previous trial had reported that 37% of patients receiving filanesib in conjunction with carfilzomib showed lower levels of paraprotein, also known as "M protein", whereas only 16% of controls (i.e. those receiving only carfilzomib) showed such a reduction. In addition, a report by the International Myeloma Working Group concluded that filanesib was "effective in monotherapy as well as in combination with dexamethasone in heavily pretreated patients." According to Jatin Shah, an assistant professor at University of Texas MD Anderson Cancer Center, the primary adverse effect of treatment with filanesib observed in trials conducted thus far is reversible neutropenia, though it is possible that it may cause low blood cell counts as well. Shah et al. have conducted a phase II study of filanesib both by itself, and in combination with dexamethasone, presented at the annual meeting of the American Society of Hematology. In December 2013, further clinical trial results were presented, also at the annual meeting of the American Society of Hematology; the results concluded that 16 percent of patients who had received a median of six prior therapies responded to single-agent filanesib. In the week after this presentation, Array BioPharma's stock fell by 16%. In February 2014, a review was published by researchers from the University of Salamanca in Spain, which concluded that "...some of these novel agents [to treat multiple myeloma] seem promising, such as monoclonal antibodies (anti-CD38 — daratumumab or anti-CS1 — elotuzumab) or the kinesin protein inhibitor Arry-520."

A 2016 phase 1 dose-escalation study found that the studied dosing regimen of filanesib combined with bortezomib and dexamethasone had a favorable safety profile. The same study reported that this combination of drugs "appears to have durable activity in patients with recurrent/refractory multiple myeloma."
