= YEATS domain =

Protein domain found in a variety of proteins from eukaryotic organisms

Identifiers
- Symbol: YEATS
- Pfam: PF03366
- InterPro: IPR005033
- PROSITE: PS51037
Available protein structures:
- Pfam: structures / ECOD
- PDB: RCSB PDB; PDBe; PDBj
- PDBsum: structure summary
- PDB: 4tmp, 3fk3, 3rls, 2l7e, 3qrl

In molecular biology, the YEATS domain is a protein domain found in a variety of proteins from eukaryotic organisms. YEATS domain proteins are found in a variety of chromatin modification molecular complexes. Structurally the domain has an immunoglobulin like fold. The YEATS domain has shown to bind to acetyllysine protein modifications. In addition to lysine acetylation, the YEATS domain has shown to be a reader domain for various lysine acylations, with highest affinity for lysine crotonylation.

== See also ==
Bromodomain
