= TPX2 =

Protein-coding gene in the species Homo sapiens

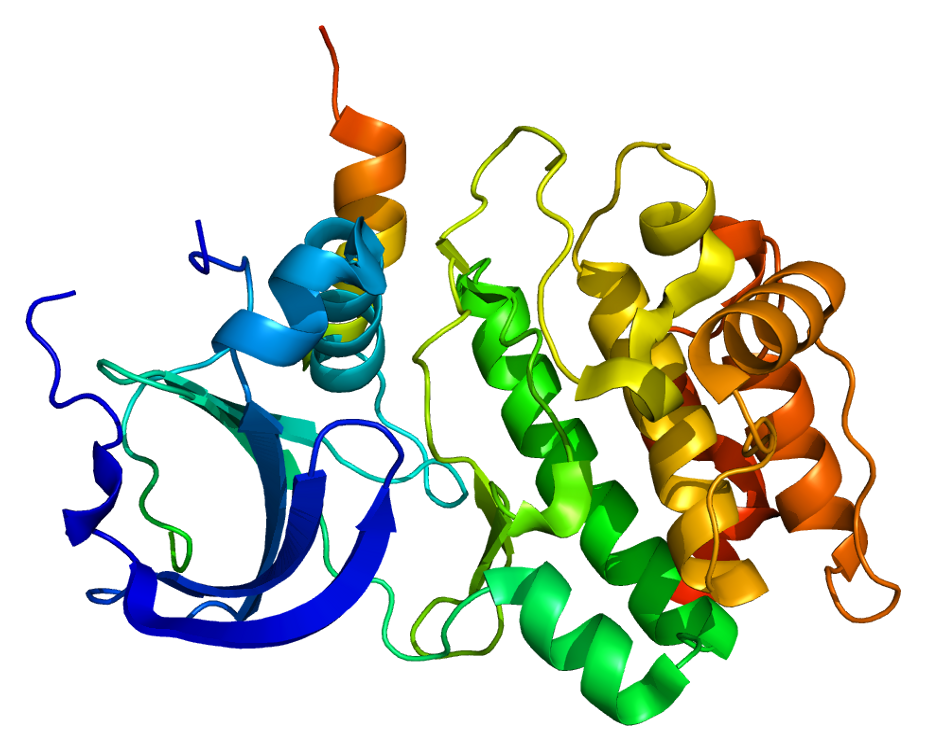

Identifiers
- Aliases: TPX2, C20orf1, C20orf2, DIL-2, DIL2, FLS353, GD:C20orf1, HCA519, HCTP4, REPP86, p100, microtubule nucleation factor, TPX2 microtubule nucleation factor
- External IDs: OMIM: 605917; MGI: 1919369; GeneCards: TPX2
Available structures
PDB	Ortholog search: PDBe RCSB
PDB	List of PDB id codes 1OL5, 3E5A, 3HA6, 4C3P

Gene location (Human)
Chr.	Chromosome 20 (human)
Band	20q11.21	Start	31,739,271 bp
Band	20q11.21	End	31,801,805 bp

Gene location (Mouse)
Chr.	Chromosome 2 (mouse)
Band	2|2 H1	Start	152,689,884 bp
Band	2|2 H1	End	152,737,241 bp
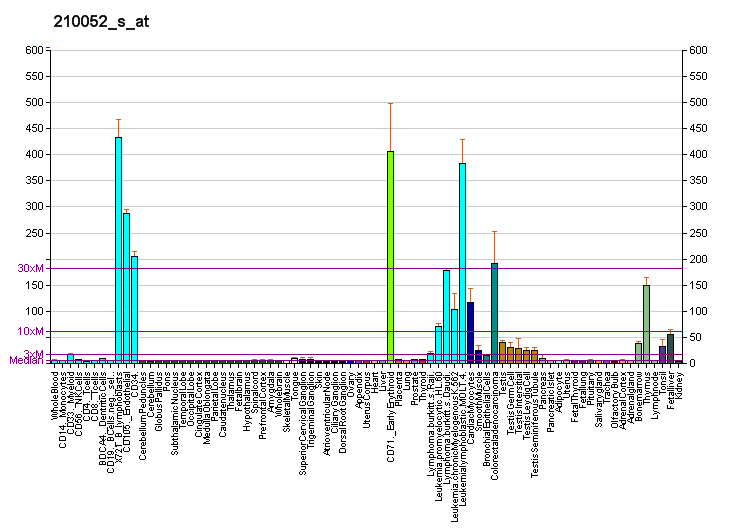
RNA expression pattern
Bgee	Human / Mouse (ortholog); Top expressed in: ventricular zone; ganglionic eminence; oocyte; gonad; secondary oocyte; bone marrow; testicle; trabecular bone; right testis; left testis / Top expressed in: tail of embryo; genital tubercle; ventricular zone; zygote; fetal liver hematopoietic progenitor cell; secondary oocyte; primitive streak; epiblast; endothelial cell of lymphatic vessel; primary oocyte; More reference expression data
BioGPS	More reference expression data
Gene ontology
Molecular function	GTP binding; importin-alpha family protein binding; ATP binding; protein binding; protein kinase binding
Cellular component	cytoplasm; nucleus; spindle pole; microtubule; microtubule cytoskeleton; axon hillock; cytoskeleton; spindle; cytosol; nucleoplasm; mitotic spindle; microtubule organizing center; intercellular bridge
Biological process	regulation of mitotic spindle organization; cell cycle; cell division; apoptotic process; mitotic spindle assembly; cell population proliferation; activation of protein kinase activity; regulation of signal transduction by p53 class mediator; mitotic cell cycle; regulation of G2/M transition of mitotic cell cycle
Sources:Amigo / QuickGO
Orthologs
Databases	NCBI: entry; OMA: entry
Species	Human	Mouse
Entrez	22974	72119
Ensembl	ENSG00000088325	ENSMUSG00000027469
UniProt	Q9ULW0	A2APB8
RefSeq (mRNA)	NM_012112	NM_001141975; NM_001141976; NM_001141977; NM_001141978; NM_028109
RefSeq (protein)	NP_036244	NP_001135447; NP_001135448; NP_001135449; NP_001135450; NP_082385
Location (UCSC)	Chr 20: 31.74 – 31.8 Mb	Chr 2: 152.69 – 152.74 Mb
PubMed search
- Wikidata
View/Edit Human	View/Edit Mouse

Targeting protein for Xklp2 is a protein that in humans is encoded by the TPX2 gene. It is one of the many spindle assembly factors that play a key role in inducing microtubule assembly and growth during M phase.

== Key domains of TPX2 ==
TPX2 has been reported to have two NLS-containing domains that mediate its localization to microtubules; one in the amino-terminal domain, and the other in the carboxy-terminal domain. In addition to an NLS, the carboxy-terminal domain of TPX2 consists of tandem repeats that cover over two-thirds of the protein and are computationally predicted to consist of predominantly alpha-helical content. This region can be further divided into five clusters of conserved residues separated by unstructured regions: α3-7. α3-6 all contain a central α-helical region that is followed by a characteristic "FKARP" motif. α7 is longer and exhibits a long α-helical stretch that is computationally predicted to form a coiled coil. Lastly, the final 35 amino acids of the carboxy-terminus of TPX2 are responsible for interacting with tetrameric kinesin Eg5.

TPX2 contains one KEN box (K-E-N) motif at amino acid 87 and three D-box (R-X-X-L) motifs at amino acids 119, 341, and 708. Both motif types have been suspected to be important in regulation and degradation of TPX2 by the APC/C (see "Regulation of TPX2 in the Cell Cycle"), as typically mutations in these motifs render substrates resistant to ubiquitination by the APC/C. However, in vitro ubiquitination assays have shown that only the first 83 amino acids of the N-terminal region of TPX2 along with the KEN box are pertinent for recognition by Cdh1, an activator of the APC/C.

== Role in microtubule assembly ==
TPX2 has been shown in several biochemical assays to behave as a microtubule-associated protein (MAP) and co-localize with spindle microtubules during M-phase. It plays a role in microtubule nucleation and is regulated by importin proteins.

TPX2 serves as a complement, depleting importin α affinity in order to allow RanGTP-induced microtubule nucleation. This has been demonstrated both in vitro in Xenopus laevis egg extracts, and with the human homologue in vivo in HeLa cells. TPX2 is also important in activating and recruiting Aurora A kinase, a kinase responsible for phosphorylating TPX2 and essential for cell proliferation. In the presence of nuclear import factor importin α, TPX2 is bound and prevented from binding Aurora A kinase, though it is still able to bind microtubules via its amino-terminal domain. This leads to inhibition of M phase microtubule nucleation. In contrast, TPX2 is freed from inhibition by displacement of importin α via RanGTP, though RanGTP is not required for free TPX2 activity, as TPX2 has been shown to induce microtubule assembly in the absence of exogenous and depletion of endogenous RanGTP. This suggests that TPX2 is downstream of RanGTP activity, but whether TPX2 is directly regulated by RanGTP still remains to be determined.

The mechanism by which TPX2 promotes microtubule nucleation has yet to be determined. One proposed mechanism has been based on TPX2's role in directly suppressing tubulin subunit off-rates at the microtubule tip during microtubule assembly and disassembly, verified by fluorescence microscopy. This is made possible partially by TPX2's role in sequestering free tubulin subunits and nucleating small multi-subunit tubulin complexes, which inadvertently also slows the rate of growth by decreasing the effective free tubulin concentration. TPX2's stabilization of the microtubule in its polymer form therefore contributes to microtubule nucleation. Computational simulations speculate that TPX2 suppresses tubulin subunit kinetics at the microtubule tip by randomly increasing the bond stability between adjacent tubulin subunits.

In addition, TPX2 has been shown to be important in chromatin-dependent spindle assembly. Even with duplicated centrosomes, TPX2 has been demonstrated to be required for formation of a stable bipolar spindle with overlapping antiparallel microtubule arrays. More specifically, TPX2 contributes to microtubule branching during spindle assembly by cooperating with augmin in order to amplify microtubule mass and preserve its polarity. Branching nucleation by TPX2 is observed without RanGTP, though more fan-shaped microtubule structures are formed when both RanGTP and TPX2 are present. The rate of branched formation is also enhanced in the presence of both components compared to Ran alone.

The TPX2 region necessary for branching microtubule nucleation resides in its carboxy-terminal half (amino acids 319-716), with TPX2 domains α5-7 as the minimal necessary requirement and domains α3-4 serving as contributors to nucleation efficiency by enabling earlier induction at faster rates. The amino-terminal half of TPX2 also increases the efficiency of the reaction. TPX2 α5-7 is different from the remainder of the protein in that it contains conserved regions in its amino acid sequence that share sequence similarity with two known γ-TuRC nucleation activator motifs: SPM and γ-TuRC. The SPM-like motif is found within the α5 domain, while the γTuNA-like motif is found to start in the α5 domain and stretch into the SPM-like motif. Without these two motifs, no microtubule nucleation was observed in vitro, though microtubule binding ability was maintained. However, these two motifs are not the only essential ones in microtubule branching nucleation; the FKARP motifs of α5 and α6 are also essential for stimulating this process. Furthermore, the α-helical region stretch of domain α7 and the C-terminal residues that interact with Eg5 are critical for microtubule branching nucleation as well. While α5-7 domains are important in this process, none of them have intrinsic microtubule nucleation activity.

In terms of binding to and bundling microtubules, at least any of the three domains α3-7 of TPX2 are necessary for significant binding and bundling in vitro. Furthermore, it is likely that the domains cooperatively mediate microtubule binding and bundling, as successive addition or subtraction of a domain does not result in a linear change in microtubule binding and bundling capacity.

== Activation and reciprocation through Aurora A kinase ==
TPX2 recruits and activates Aurora A kinase by utilizing its short 43 amino acid long amino-terminal sequence to bind the catalytic domain of Aurora A, locking the kinase into its active conformation. More specifically, this interaction positions the activation segment of the kinase into a more favorable conformation for substrate binding and swings the crucial phosphothreonine residue, a target usually exposed and accessible for deactivation of Aurora A kinase by PP1, into a buried position, thereby locking Aurora A into an active conformation. Notably, this recognition between TPX2 and Aurora A is analogous to that between the cAMP-dependent protein kinase (cAPK) catalytic core and its flanking region, suggesting a recurring theme in kinase regulation. Activated Aurora A in turn phosphorylates TPX2, but it is still unclear how Aurora A's phosphorylation of TPX2 affects its activities.

== Role in cleavage arrest and interaction with Eg5 ==
When four-fold TPX2 over the endogenous level was injected into a blastomere with a two-cell embryo, cleavage arrest was induced. This arrest has been attributed to the amino acids 471-715 of the carboxy-terminus of the TPX2 protein, with the last 35 amino acids being absolutely necessary for inducing cleavage arrest. During cytokinesis failure, cycles of DNA synthesis and mitosis continue. Notably, spindle poles fail to segregate, leading to a failure to establish a bipolar spindle, a spindle midzone, and a central spindle complex. Because cleavage furrow ingression is primarily triggered by signals from the spindle midzone, these biological phenotypes could account for the failure of this event due to the inability to activate the spindle checkpoint. Instead of a bipolar spindle, both spindle poles are in apposition, with an impairment of pushing forces generated by interpolar microtubules.

The mechanistic cause behind cleavage arrest is attributed to TPX2's ability to directly bind motor protein Eg5, which requires the last 35 amino acids of the TPX2 carboxy-terminus for its interaction. When Eg5 was co-injected with TPX2 in vivo, cleavage furrow arrest was blocked and ingression was observed. This suggests that the carboxy-terminus of TPX2 regulates spindle pole movement via an Eg5-dependent mechanism.

== Binding with Xlp2 ==
When bound to microtubules, TPX2 recruits a plus-end directed motor protein, Xlp2, a protein that is required in early mitosis and localizes to spindle poles, to microtubule minus ends of asters. Like TPX2's localization to microtubules, this recruitment is also RanGTP independent.

== Regulation of TPX2 in the cell cycle ==
Monitoring TPX2 gene mRNA expression during cell cycle progression in synchronized HeLa cells revealed that TPX2 expression is high in G2/M phase, decreases dramatically upon G1 phase entry, increases upon entry into S phase, and peaks again at the next G2/M phase. This is correlated by results showing an increased stability of TPX2 in S-phase extracts compared to that of TPX2 in mitotic extracts, indicated by a significant increase in TPX2 half-life. The drop in TPX2 is consistent with the drastic reorganization in structure and dynamics of the mitotic spindle.

Overall, TPX2 has been shown through in vivo experiments to be regulated by the APC/C^{Cdh1} pathway. The instability and drop in TPX2 at mitotic exit is dependent on both the anaphase-promoting complex/cyclosome (APC/C) and an ubiquitin ligase integral in mitotic progression, along with APC/C's activator protein, Cdh1. This is a result of TPX2 being bound directly by Cdh1, and not Cdc20 or any other substrate of APC/C^{Cdh1}, and designated for degradation by APC/C. Moreover, the Cdh1-TPX2 binding interaction produces the TPX2 stability seen during mitosis up until mitotic exit: The amino-terminal region of Cdh1 (amino acids 1-125) can act as a dominant negative mutant when expressed in mammalian cells, stabilizing APC/C^{Cdh1} substrates such as TPX2 by competitive binding.

== Role in the nucleus ==
When the cell is in interphase, because of its ability to bind to importin α and β, TPX2 has been found localized in the nucleus. This has been proposed to be a physical mechanism by which proteins that operate in M phase are inactivated in interphase. TPX2 during M-phase accumulates at the poles of spindles in a "dynein-dynactin-dependent way." The mechanism of this localization currently remains unclear, but it is not RanGTP dependent despite its downfield position from RanGTP activity, as TPX2 in Xenopus laevis egg extracts have been shown to accumulate at the center of microtubule asters (after the addition of centrosomes, taxol, or DMSO) and bind to pure microtubules in the presence of importins.

Though nuclear import of TPX2 is thought to sequester TPX2 away from cytoplasmic tubulin in order to solely prevent premature spindle assembly, roles of nuclear TPX2 have recently been discovered. One of these roles is with the DNA damage response, where depletion of TPX2 in cells leads to a transient increase in γ-H2AX (the phosphorylated form of H2AX, the form that serves as a marker of DNA damage response amplification) levels in cells treated with ionizing radiation, and overexpression of TPX2 leads to a decrease in the number of ionizing radiation-induced MDC1 foci and γ-H2AX levels. This is supported by the discovery of TPX2 accumulation at DNA double strand breaks and association with the machinery of DNA damage response that controls the amplification of γ-H2AX. However, the exact molecular mechanisms by which TPX2 impacts the ionizing radiation-dependent γ-H2AX levels still remains to be discovered. Note that TPX2's function in the DNA damage response is independent of its mitotic function, and is therefore independent of apoptosis.

When no ionizing radiation is present, TPX2 readily associates with the chromatin. Interestingly, overexpression of TPX2 in these conditions produces abnormal DAPI staining patterns, where DAPI staining is more structured and compartmentalized than the typical uniformly-distributed DAPI staining in wild type cells. Moreover, when TPX2 levels were depleted in unirradiated cells, no significant changes in γ-H2AX levels were found, but the levels of H4K16ac, the acetylated form of H4K16 (a histone post-translationally modified during DNA damage response), decreased. This decrease is unaffected by ionizing radiation, yet correlates with the decrease in γ-H2AX under such conditions. A result of this decrease is a defect in BP531 (p53 binding protein 1) recruitment to chromosomal breaks, as recruitment is dependent on the acetylation status of H4K16. As with TPX2 with regards to its impact on ionizing radiation-dependent γ-H2AX levels, the molecular mechanism by which TPX2 affects the acetylation status of H4K16 remains to be discovered.

== Relevance in cancer ==
Because of its integral role in microtubule assembly and therefore mitosis, TPX2 is found to be overexpressed in different types of human cancers including hepatocellular carcinoma (HCC), medullary thyroid cancer, bladder carcinoma, and estrogen receptor-positive metastatic breast cancer and contributes to tumor growth and metastasis. In HCC, TPX2 has been shown to be positively correlated with poor prognosis, metastasis, and recurrence. Studies on TPX2 in HCC have also showed that TPX2 promotes tumoriogenesis and liver cancer cell growth by increasing tumor spheroid and diminishing cell growth inhibition, demonstrated by knocking out endogenous expression of TPX2 using TPX2 si-RNA.

As a result, TPX2 has recently been a topic of interest for learning more about the relationship between mitotic errors and tumorigenesis, along with novel cancer therapies. So far, research on depleting TPX2 via TPX2 si-RNA in HCC cells in vitro has shown significant effects in diminishing cell motility and invasion (i.e. metastasis), along with diminishing proteins involved in the G1 to S phase transition. Similar results have been shown with TPX2 depletion in esophageal cancer EC9706 cells, leading to reduced cancer cell growth and invasion ability, and in cervical and pancreatic cancer with regards to reduced tumor growth using TPX2 si-RNA transfection.

In liver cancer cells, TPX2 depletion has been linked to increased genomic instability, resulting in multinucleation and DNA damage. While many tumor cells in general accumulate mutations in genomic instability that enable them to have a growth advantage in tumor promotion and transformation, high chromosomal instability can act as a tumor-suppressing mechanism by leading to cell death. Therefore, the significant aneuploidy and genomic instability at mitotic division via TPX2 depletion can serve as a potential therapeutic target for cancer patients by eliminating highly proliferating cells.
