= Monastrol =

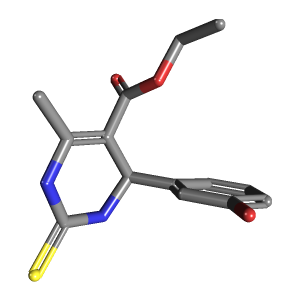

Names
- IUPAC name ethyl 4-(3-hydroxyphenyl)-6-methyl-2-sulfanylidene-3,4-dihydro-1H-pyrimidine-5-carboxylate
- Other names Monastrol

Identifiers
CAS Number	329689-23-8
3D model (JSmol)	Interactive image
ChEBI	CHEBI:75382
ChEMBL	ChEMBL236789
ChemSpider	2259791
PubChem CID	2987927
CompTox Dashboard (EPA)	DTXSID501317756 DTXSID10388124, DTXSID501317756
- InChI: InChI=1S/C14H16N2O3S/c1-3-19-13(18)11-8(2)15-14(20)16-12(11)9-5-4-6-10(17)7-9/h4-7,12,17H,3H2,1-2H3,(H2,15,16,20) Key: LOBCDGHHHHGHFA-UHFFFAOYSA-N; InChI=1/C14H16N2O3S/c1-3-19-13(18)11-8(2)15-14(20)16-12(11)9-5-4-6-10(17)7-9/h4-7,12,17H,3H2,1-2H3,(H2,15,16,20) Key: LOBCDGHHHHGHFA-UHFFFAOYAO
- SMILES: CCOC(=O)C1=C(NC(=S)NC1C2=CC(=CC=C2)O)C

Properties
Chemical formula	C_{14}H_{16}N_{2}O_{3}S
Molar mass	292.35344
- Except where otherwise noted, data are given for materials in their standard state (at 25 °C [77 °F], 100 kPa). verify (what is ?) Infobox references

Monastrol is a cell-permeable small molecule inhibitor discovered by Thomas U. Mayer in the lab of Tim Mitchison. Monastrol was shown to inhibit the kinesin-5 (also known as KIF11, Kinesin Eg5), a motor protein important for spindle bipolarity.

== Mechanism of action ==
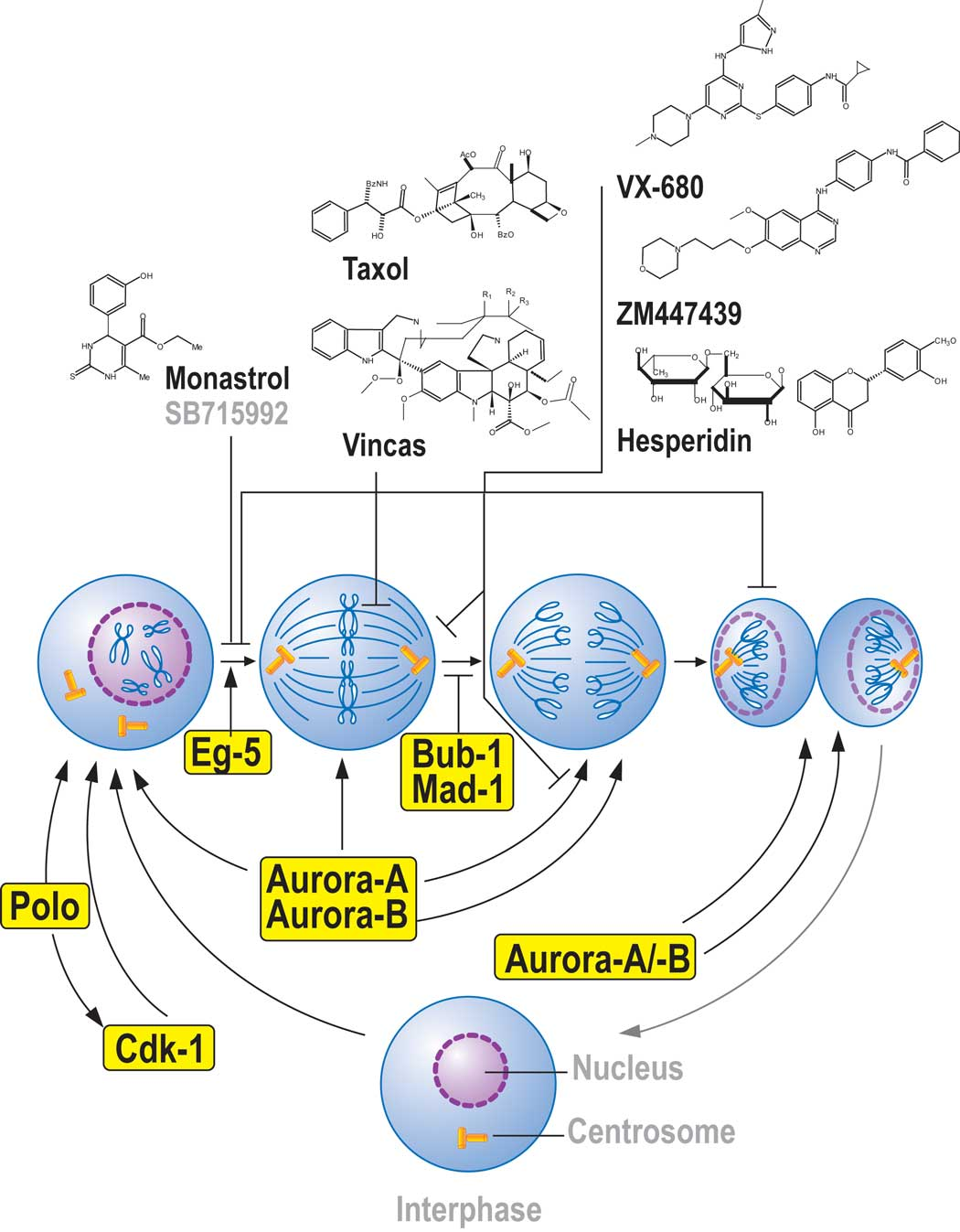
Monastrol inhibits Eg5

Monastrol binds to a long loop that is specific to the Eg5 (also known as KIF11 or kinesin-5) kinesin family, and allosterically inhibits ATPase activity of the kinesin
