= Kinesin-like protein KIF11 =

Protein-coding gene in the species Homo sapiens

KIF11
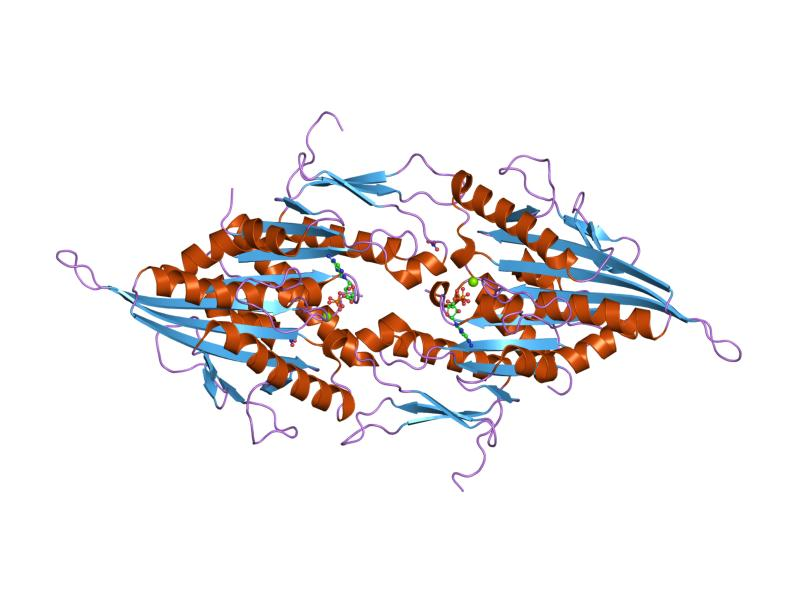

Identifiers
- Aliases: KIF11, EG5, HKSP, KNSL1, MCLMR, TRIP5, Kinesin family member 11
- External IDs: OMIM: 148760; MGI: 1098231; GeneCards: KIF11
Available structures
PDB	Ortholog search: PDBe RCSB
PDB	List of PDB id codes 1II6, 1Q0B, 1X88, 1YRS, 2FKY, 2FL2, 2FL6, 2FME, 2G1Q, 2GM1, 2IEH, 2PG2, 2Q2Y, 2Q2Z, 2UYI, 2UYM, 2WOG, 2X2R, 2X7C, 2X7D, 2X7E, 2XAE, 3CJO, 3HQD, 3K3B, 3K5E, 3KEN, 3L9H, 3WPN, 3ZCW, 4A1Z, 4A28, 4A50, 4A51, 4A5Y, 4AP0, 4AQV, 4AQW, 4AS7, 4B7B, 4BBG, 4BXN, 4CK5, 4CK6, 4CK7, 4ZCA, 4ZHI

Gene location (Human)
Chr.	Chromosome 10 (human)
Band	10q23.33	Start	92,574,105 bp
Band	10q23.33	End	92,655,395 bp

Gene location (Mouse)
Chr.	Chromosome 19 (mouse)
Band	19|19 C2	Start	37,364,851 bp
Band	19|19 C2	End	37,410,307 bp
RNA expression pattern
Bgee	Human / Mouse (ortholog); Top expressed in: ventricular zone; ganglionic eminence; secondary oocyte; gonad; bone marrow; testicle; trabecular bone; bone marrow cell; stromal cell of endometrium; gingival epithelium / Top expressed in: tail of embryo; genital tubercle; ventricular zone; thymus; epiblast; bone marrow; primary oocyte; zygote; secondary oocyte; spermatocyte; More reference expression data
BioGPS	n/a
Gene ontology
Molecular function	microtubule motor activity; nucleotide binding; microtubule binding; protein-containing complex binding; plus-end-directed microtubule motor activity; ATP binding; protein kinase binding; ATPase activity
Cellular component	spindle pole; membrane; kinesin complex; spindle; spindle microtubule; microtubule; cytoskeleton; cytoplasm; cytosol; nucleus; protein-containing complex; mitotic spindle
Biological process	antigen processing and presentation of exogenous peptide antigen via MHC class II; regulation of mitotic centrosome separation; chromosome segregation; mitotic spindle organization; cell division; spindle assembly; microtubule-based movement; mitotic spindle assembly; spindle organization; mitotic centrosome separation; cell cycle; retrograde vesicle-mediated transport, Golgi to endoplasmic reticulum; mitotic cell cycle
Sources:Amigo / QuickGO
Orthologs
Databases	NCBI: entry; OMA: entry
Species	Human	Mouse
Entrez	3832	16551
Ensembl	ENSG00000138160	ENSMUSG00000012443
UniProt	P52732	Q6P9P6
RefSeq (mRNA)	NM_004523	NM_010615
RefSeq (protein)	NP_004514	NP_034745
Location (UCSC)	Chr 10: 92.57 – 92.66 Mb	Chr 19: 37.36 – 37.41 Mb
PubMed search
- Wikidata
View/Edit Human	View/Edit Mouse

Kinesin-like protein KIF11 is a molecular motor protein that is essential in mitosis. In humans it is coded for by the gene KIF11. Kinesin-like protein KIF11 is a member of the kinesin superfamily, which are nanomotors that move along microtubule tracks in the cell. Named from studies in the early days of discovery, it is also known as Kinesin-5, or as BimC, Eg5 or N-2, based on the founding members of this kinesin family.

Currently, there are over 70 different eukaryotic kinesin-5 proteins identified by sequence similarity. Members of this protein family are known to be involved in various kinds of spindle dynamics and essential for mitosis. The function of this gene product includes chromosome positioning, centrosome separation and establishing a bipolar spindle during cell mitosis. The human kinesin-5 protein has been actively studied for its role in mitosis and its potential as a therapeutic target for cancer.

== Function ==
KIF11 (also known as kinesin-5 and Eg5) is a homotetramer which cross-links anti-parallel microtubules in the mitotic spindle to maintain spindle bipolarity. The motor domain or motor head is at the N-terminus and performs ATP hydrolysis and binds to microtubules. Kinesin-5 motors assemble into a bipolar homotetrameric structure that is capable of sliding apart bundles of anti-parallel oriented microtubules. This motor is essential for mitosis in most organisms, wherein it participates in the self-assembly of the microtubule-based mitotic spindle, but is not otherwise required for cell viability. The motor may also play a role in the proper development of mammalian neuronal processes, including growth cone navigation and elongation.

== Function in mitosis ==
In most eukaryotic cells, Kinesin-5 is thought to form cross-bridges between pairs of oppositely oriented microtubules in prophase and prometaphase and drives apart duplicated centrosomes during the formation of the mitotic spindle. This permits the establishment of a steady-state bipolar microtubule spindle structure.

Loss of Kinesin-5 function from the onset of mitosis in most eukaryotic organisms examined, including animals, plants, and fungi, results in catastrophic failure of mitosis. This motor's function is crucial during the onset of mitosis, wherein its loss of function results in the collapse, or inversion, of the spindle poles leaving centrally positioned centrosome pairs flanked by a radial array of microtubules with peripheral condensed chromosomes. The one exception to this effect is mitosis within the nematode, C. elegans, in which Kinesin-5 is not strictly essential for mitosis, but nonetheless has considerable impact on the overall fidelity of cell division.

The discovery of small chemical inhibitors of human Kinesin-5 through a pioneering in vitro phenotypic screening on cancer cell lines has led to both the development of new anticancer therapeutic agents, and to novel tools to probe the mechanism of microtubule motor proteins. This toolkit of allosteric inhibitors has been used to probe the specific role of Kinesin-5 in mitotic spindle assembly as well as fine dissection of motor domain function. Through this work it was found that, in mammalian cells, Kinesin-5 is required for the initial assembly of the mitotic spindle during prophase and prometaphase, but is dispensable to traverse subsequent anaphase during a round of mitosis. Also, the binding of the Kinesin-5 inhibitors to an allosteric site on the motor interrupts the mechanism by which this enzyme converts the chemical energy of ATP hydrolysis into the mechanical work of moving microtubules, thus providing insight on how this enzyme works.

There are many models that attempt to explain the self-assembly of the mitotic spindle based upon microtubules as a structural element, and a set of microtubule motors, including Kinesin-5 to move and order them. Many of these models attempt to explain the steady state of the spindle at metaphase based on a predicted balance of motor forces acting in opposition within the spindle microtubules. Still, it is not clear whether all the structural elements required for spindle assembly are known, or how the motors, including Kinesin-5, might be regulated in space and time. Such caveats make assessment of such models difficult. Recent data, however, finds that aspects of the 'force balance' model that posit spindle length and stability to be mediated by a balance between the minus-end directed microtubule sliding and plus-end directed microtubule sliding by opposing motors in insect cells, seems not to be the case in mammalian cells. The process of self-assembly of the mitotic spindle remains a major unsolved question in cell biology, and a robust model awaits further details of the regulation and behavior of various microtubule motors and structural elements that compose this machinery.

== Function in neurons ==
Although Kinesin-5 is required in all cells during cell division, it does not appear to play a major role in the metabolism of most non-dividing cells. Among non-dividing cells, Kinesin-5 is most enriched within neurons, wherein it decorates the large microtubule bundles extending into axons and dendrites. It has been shown, for example, that neurons remain fully viable in the background of a knock-down of Kinesin-5, but that changes in neuronal development and morphogenesis ensue. In developing neurons pharmacological inhibition and siRNA knockdown of KIF11 results in longer axons, more branches, fewer bouts of axon retraction and the inability of growth cones to turn on contact with repulsive substrates. In migratory neurons, inhibition of KIF11 causes neurons to migrate in a random pattern and form shorter leading processes. KIF11, like KIF15 and KIF23, is thought to act as a restrictor of short microtubules moving bi-directionally along the axon, exerting forces antagonistically to cytoplasmic dynein. In mature neurons, KIF11 restricts the movement of short microtubules in dendrites, contributing to the formation of characteristic shape of dendrites. KIF11 is also expressed in adult dorsal root ganglion neurons, although at a much diminished level. In adult neurons It has a similar effect on inhibiting the rate of short microtubule transport so pharmacological inhibition and siRNA knockdown of adult KIF11 may be a potential therapeutic tool for the augmentation of adult axon regeneration. However, a clear in vivo role for Kinesin-5 in neurogenesis remains to be elucidated. Of note is that unusual peripheral neuropathies have not been observed in patients undergoing recent phase I or phase II trials of Kinesin-5 inhibitors for potential anti-cancer therapy.

== Functional regulation ==
In 1995, Kinesin-5 was determined to be post-translationally phosphorylated within its C-terminal tail. Once Kinesin-5 is phosphorylated at this residue in early prophase, it localizes to the mitotic spindle where it binds to microtubules. An additional phosphosite was identified on the Kinesin-5 tail in 2008, however, only approximately 3% of the total microtubule-associated Kinesin-5 is phosphorylated at this residues. While additional phosphosites or other post-translational modifications within the Kinesin-5 tail, stalk, and motor have been identified, no other modifications have been proven as necessary for Kinesin-5 to perform its necessary tasks in mitosis.

Kinesin-5 is also regulated through direct interaction with other proteins. The microtubule-associated protein, TPX2, associates with Kinesin-5 in mitosis. Their interaction is necessary for Kinesin-5 localization to the mitotic spindle, for stabilizing the spindle, and for spindle pole segregation. Kinesin-5 has been shown to interact with the dynactin subunit p150Glued as well as many other cell cycle related proteins in vivo and in vitro, however, additional experimentation is needed to confirm that their association is necessary for Kinesin-5 to function normally.

== Molecular mechanism ==
ATP hydrolysis

Kinesin-5, like all motor proteins, breaks down ATP into ADP and inorganic phosphate, using a water molecule, and converts the chemical energy to force and motion along microtubules. Kinetic experiments reveal rates of how fast intermediate steps in catalysis occur and the most extensive set of studies on Kinesin-5 kinetics has been on the human protein. X-ray crystallography, cryo-electron microscopy, and real-time infrared spectroscopy have been used to measure the structure of Kinesin-5 in the different catalytic intermediate states. Changes in the secondary structure, or conformational switching, is required to convert and amplify biochemical changes in the catalytic active site into larger movements necessary for cellular motion. For example, the first step of ATP hydrolysis, which is the attack of the terminal phosphate of ATP by a water molecule, had not been observed by x-ray crystallography in any kinesin protein, until recently in Kinesin-5. This crystal structure showed that there was not one, but rather two, water molecules and they are in close association with each other. A two-water catalytic model was proposed and confirmed by an alternate method to track Kinesin-5 catalysis in real-time and in a kinesin protein in a different subfamily. Two-water catalytic models also are proposed in a divergent motor protein, myosin, and observed experimentally in one of its crystal structures.

Mechanical Properties

The antiparallel tetrameric organization of the Kinesin-5 family is fundamentally different from the majority of other kinesins that are dimers, such as the well-characterized conventional Kinesin-1 (KIF5B). Conventional kinesin dimerizes in such a manner that the catalytic (head) domains are together on one end of the complex to facilitate hand-over-hand movement along a microtubule that enables long-range, directed transport of cellular cargoes. The unique assembly of Kinesin-5 proteins not only organizes the protein complex for a different cellular function (antiparallel microtubule sliding, described above) but also made it difficult to study the mechanical properties of the motor using the classical experiments that were designed for dimeric kinesins. These obstacles have been overcome by either adapting the original experiments to analyze the tetrameric organization of Kinesin-5, or by working with shorter Kinesin-5 proteins that form dimers like conventional kinesin.

The most striking outcomes of the analysis of Kinesin-5 motility is that it is slow – about 10 times slower than conventional Kinesin-1 – with a velocity in the range of 50 nanometers per second and that it could generate very high levels of mechanical force (7-9 picoNewtons per molecule). These values come from three types of experimental data: microtubule gliding assays, single molecule motility assays, and optical trap assays. In microtubule gliding assays, kinesins are attached to a glass surface and microtubules are laid down over the top. Since the motors are attached to the glass, their motile behavior translates into movement of the microtubule across the anchored kinesins, akin to someone crowd surfing. These experiments gave us the first analysis of Kinesin-5 motility.

Microtubule gliding by Kinesin-5

By attaching microtubules to the glass surface first, then adding Kinesin-5 with free microtubules in solution, it was possible to adapt the microtubule gliding assays to show that Kinesin-5 can crosslink two microtubules and move them in opposite directions. This experiment showed that Kinesin-5 was indeed capable of carrying out the role that had been proposed for it in mitosis – sliding oppositely oriented microtubules in the mitotic spindle. To study the behavior of individual Kinesin-5 molecules, single molecule motility assays were performed by attaching microtubules to a glass surface, then adding a dilute solution of Kinesin-5 with a fluorophore attached. This experimental setup enables the observer to follow separate Kinesin-5 molecules as they "walk" along the microtubule, providing not only information about velocity, but also about processivity – the ability of a kinesin to take multiple steps along the microtubule without dissociating. Kinesin-5 in this setup has shown bi-directionality. Thus it can "walk" in both direction. The switching of direction is controlled with high precision. In single molecule motility assays, velocities for Kinesin-5 were similar to those seen in microtubule gliding assays, and the motor was observed to be weakly processive. In optical trap experiments, Kinesin-5 molecules are attached to a bead that can be held in place by a finely focused laser. By moving the bead close to a microtubule, the kinesin can bind to the microtubule and begin stepping, pulling the bead along behind it. Since the bead is being held in place by the trap laser, it acts like a spring and exerts a force that resists the forward movement of the kinesin. This allows for the measurement of the stall force – the maximum amount of force that can be exerted by a motor before it releases from the microtubule. Optical trap experiments showed that Kinesin-5 generates a maximum of 7 picoNewtons of force before releasing, but that its behavior differs from that of other kinesins in that there was no observable plateau phase in which the motor "struggles" at its maximal force generation before letting go. Extrapolation of kinetic data suggests that the maximal observed force generated in the optical trap by Kinesin-5 is actually an underestimate and that it theoretically can exert up to 9 picoNewtons of force as a maximum, although further experimental work is required to test this.

== Pharmacological inhibitors ==
Inhibitors of KIF11 have been developed as chemotherapeutic agents in the treatment of cancer. Drugs that specifically inhibit only human Kinesin-5 are alternatives to the taxanes and vinc alkaloids that target microtubules, and thus all cells, and that are currently used clinically. Inhibition of Kinesin-5 causes cells to undergo mitotic arrest, undergo apoptosis and form monoaster spindles. The first KIF11 inhibitor, monastrol was discovered in a chemical screen of a large library of cell permeable compounds. Since then, over 100 different chemical classes of allosteric inhibitors have been identified in the scientific literature and they have a wide range in potency against human Kinesin-5. Common KIF11 inhibitors include:

- monastrol,
- S-Trityl-L-cysteine (STLC),
- HR22C16, and
- CK0106023.

The majority of human Kinesin-5 inhibitors are selective, because they bind to a drug 'hot spot', composed of residues from the α2 and α3 helices and a flexible L5 loop on the surface of the motor domain. This L5 loop has high sequence variability amongst the Kinesin-5 orthologs and other kinesins within the superfamily. The L5 loop in human Kinesin-5 closes around the inhibitor and is open in the absence of inhibitor. These structural changes are correlated with other changes in the catalytic active site. Other sites of inhibitor binding have been identified in the human Kinesin-5 motor domain. For inhibitors that bind to the L5 pocket, the mechanism of inhibition is that they slow ADP release from the catalytic active site and inhibit ATP-dependent directional motion. However, a previously unknown diffusive motion by Kinesin-5 along microtubules was uncovered when monastrol inhibited the motor domain.

Small-molecule inhibitors are not only important tools for understanding nanomotors in cells; they are also have potential for serving as tools in the clinic. Induced by human Kinesin-5 inhibitors, mitotic arrest results in apoptosis in some tumor cell lines and human tumor xenograft models. With these promising preclinical studies, ispinesib (SB-715992; Cytokinetics/GSK), SB-743921 from Cytokinetics/GSK, MK-0731 from Merck, filanesib (ARRY-520) (Array BioPharma), and litronesib (LY2523355) (Eli Lilly) have entered into clinical trials. Although second-generation Kinesin-5 inhibitors have had better success, none have been fully developed and marketed as an anti-cancer treatment.

The role of specific residues in the L5 pocket (L5, α2, and α3) in human Kinesin-5 has been tested, but not yet been systematically explored. The initial goal of these mutation experiments was to determine which residues had greatest pharmacological importance in drug development. For example, mutations in the KIF11 gene convey resistance of mitotic cell lines to inhibitors such as monastrol and STLC. For example, point mutations in the inhibitor binding pocket, R119A, D130A, L132A, I136A, L214A and E215A confer resistance to monastrol, while R119A, D130A and L214A mutations confer resistance to STLC. In contrast to the loss-of-function experiments, a gain-of-function experiment using Drosophila Kinesin-5 showed that all L5-directed inhibitors do not allosterically communicate in the same way within the Kinesin-5 motor domain.

A second purpose of mutational studies is to understand how drug resistance in cells is conferred from only changing one residue. These changes in the inhibitor-binding pocket are correlated with structural modification, or twist, of the central beta-sheet of the Kinesin-5 motor domain. In this manner, the L5 loop may be able to directly control nucleotide binding and beta-sheet twist can manipulate the adjacent microtubule-binding site. This may explain how tumor cells rapidly can become drug-resistant to KIF11 inhibitors.

== Pharmacological degraders ==
In addition to small-molecule inhibitors, KIF11 has also been explored as a target for targeted protein degradation. Yan Feng, Michael Fan, and colleagues reported in the Journal of Clinical Oncology the development of a cereblon (CRBN)-recruiting KIF11 degrader as part of a KIF11 degrader-antibody conjugate (DAC) strategy for cancer therapy. In their study, the degrader induced rapid KIF11 degradation, increased phospho-histone H3 levels consistent with mitotic arrest, and inhibited cancer cell growth. DACs incorporating the degrader also produced antigen-dependent KIF11 degradation and antiproliferative activity in vitro, suggesting a potential alternative to conventional KIF11 inhibitors. This report was presented at the 2025 American Society of Clinical Oncology (ASCO) Annual Meeting.

== Human mutations ==
KIF11 mutations have been widely described in cancer, and many trials with KIF11 inhibitors are ongoing.

== Clinical significance ==
Germline mutations in KIF11 cause microcephaly with or without chorioretinopathy, lymphedema, or mental retardation (MCLMR). This syndrome is observed as an autosomal dominant disorder with variable expressivity but can also be sporadic. It is characterized by mild-to-severe microcephaly, often associated with developmental delay, ocular defects and lymphedema, usually on the dorsum of the feet. Phenotypic evaluation of patients (n = 87) revealed microcephaly in 91%, eye anomalies in 72%, intellectual disability in 67% and lymphedema in 47% of the patients. Unaffected carriers were rare (4 out of 87: 5%). Family history is not a requisite for diagnosis; 31% (16 out of 52) were de novo cases. All inherited cases, and 50% of sporadic cases of MCLMR are due to germline KIF11 mutations.
