= RAB4B =

Identifiers
- Aliases: RAB4B, member RAS oncogene family
- External IDs: OMIM: 612945; MGI: 105071; GeneCards: RAB4B
Available structures
| PDB | Ortholog search: PDBe RCSB |
| PDB | List of PDB id codes 2O52 |
Enzyme activity
| EC # | BRENDA | ExPASy | KEGG | MetaCyc |
|---|---|---|---|---|
| 3.6.5.2 | ↗ | ↗ | ↗ | ↗ |

Gene location (Human)
| Chr. | Chromosome 19 (human) |
| Band | 19q13.2 | Start | 40,778,216 bp |
| Band | 19q13.2 | End | 40,796,942 bp |

Gene location (Mouse)
| Chr. | Chromosome 7 (mouse) |
| Band | 7 A3|7 15.84 cM | Start | 26,867,849 bp |
| Band | 7 A3|7 15.84 cM | End | 26,878,321 bp |
RNA expression pattern
| Bgee | Human / Mouse (ortholog); Top expressed in: C1 segment; granulocyte; primary visual cortex; substantia nigra; Brodmann area 9; monocyte; hippocampus proper; hypothalamus; putamen; right frontal lobe / Top expressed in: granulocyte; spleen; islet of Langerhans; cerebellar cortex; adrenal gland; superior frontal gyrus; primary visual cortex; hippocampus proper; striatum of neuraxis; thymus; More reference expression data |
| BioGPS | n/a |
Gene ontology
| Molecular function | nucleotide binding; GTP binding; GTPase activity; protein binding; molecular function |
| Cellular component | perinuclear region of cytoplasm; recycling endosome; insulin-responsive compartment; membrane; plasma membrane; secretory granule membrane; endosome |
| Biological process | protein transport; regulation of endocytosis; glucose import; neutrophil degranulation; intracellular protein transport; Rab protein signal transduction |
Sources:Amigo / QuickGO
Orthologs
| Databases | NCBI: entry; OMA: entry |
| Species | Human | Mouse |
| Entrez | 53916 | 19342 |
| Ensembl | ENSG00000167578 | ENSMUSG00000053291 |
| UniProt | P61018 | Q91ZR1 |
| RefSeq (mRNA) | NM_016154 | NM_029391 |
| RefSeq (protein) | NP_057238 | NP_083667 |
| Location (UCSC) | Chr 19: 40.78 – 40.8 Mb | Chr 7: 26.87 – 26.88 Mb |
| PubMed search |
- Wikidata
| View/Edit Human | View/Edit Mouse |

Ras-related protein Rab-4B is a protein that in humans is encoded by the RAB4B gene.

Ras-related protein Rab-4B is involved in the vesicle recycling process of endocytosis. Eukaryotic cells uptake cargo from their external environment via donor vesicle budding and fusion of the bud with its target cell membrane. Many proteins are required to maintain homeostasis through this process and to tightly regulate the transport, docking and recycling of materials within the cell. Rab-4B proteins contribute to the regulation of endocytotic recycling in order to control vesicular trafficking.

== Function ==
RAB proteins are a family of small GTPases that play a role in vesicular transportation regulation. Rab-4B has been shown to be localized to the initial stages of endocytosis, through its interaction with the early endosome.

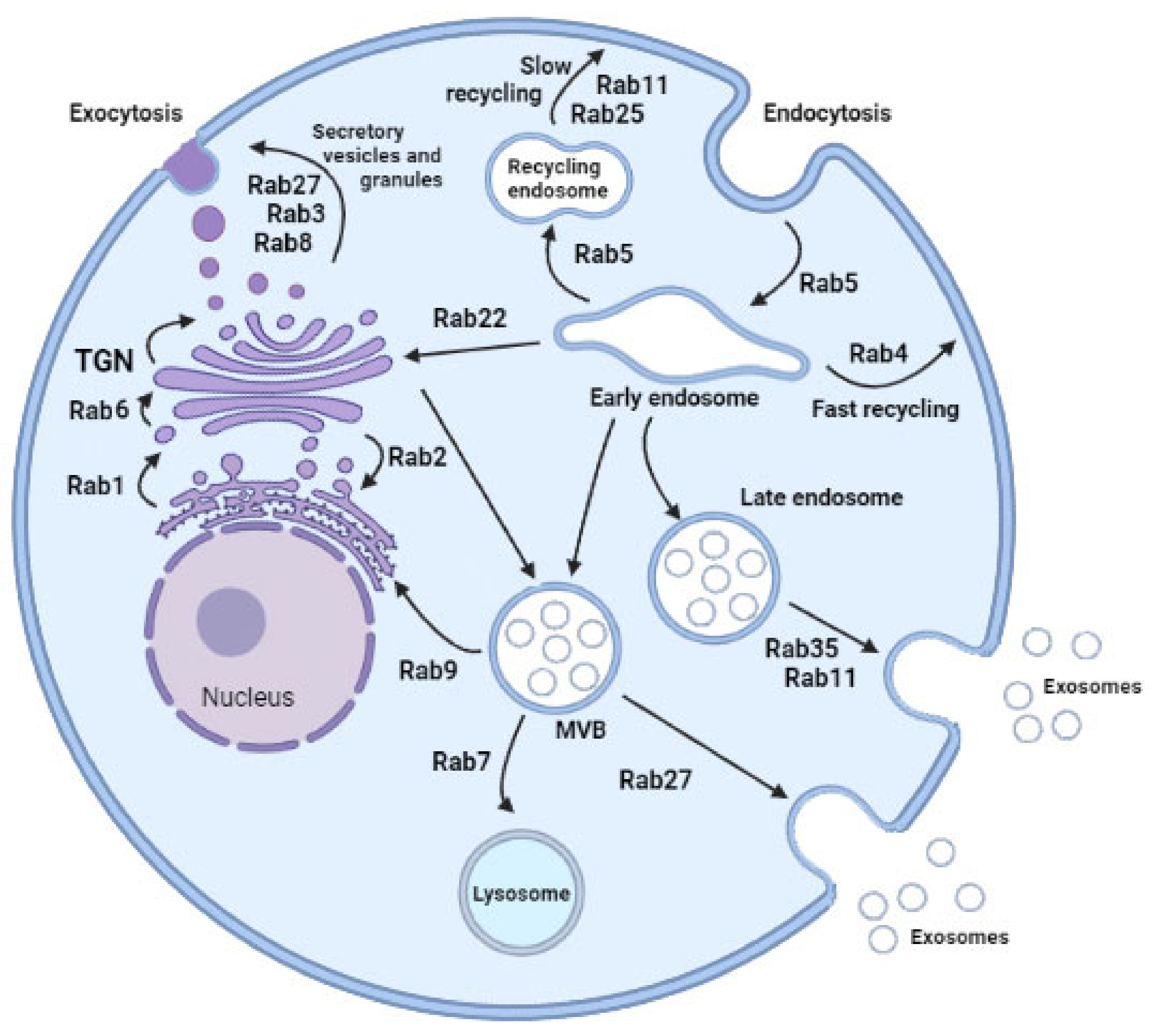
Shows the role of RAB4B in its interactions with the early endosome.

In addition, Rab-4B is thought to be important in the insulin pathway with its involvement with GLUT4 trafficking. GLUT4 plays a crucial role in maintaining glucose balance, and is primarily found in cells that respond to insulin for glucose uptake, such as adipocytes. Upon stimulation by insulin, RAB-4B is activated and able to contribute to the translocation of GLUT4 to the cell membrane, facilitating glucose uptake.

RAB-4B has been shown to contribute to the recycling of transferrin receptors through the early endosome interaction.

== Interactions ==
Rab-4B has also been shown to interact with kinesin and dynein motor proteins during endocytosis and exocytosis. KIF3B is a kinesin motor protein that is also involved in the transport of GLUT4. RAB-4b is activated due to insulin stimulation, which is then associated with KIF3B. Therefore, it is indicated that the KIF3B motor protein can then attach to the microtubule, allowing GLUT4 exocytosis.

Another protein Rab-4B interacts with is STX4. STX4 is involved in the translocation of GLUT4, and this is facilitated when RAB4B is activated and can directly interact with STX4.

Rab4B has also been shown to interact with:

- CD2AP
- RABEP1
- RAB11FIP1

== Regulation ==
Rab-4B proteins have been found to be co-regulated with MHC Class II genes.

== Clinical significance ==
Rab4B is involved in cellular trafficking and has been revealed to play an important role in inflammation and insulin response, specifically through T cells. Obesity alters the composition of T cells in adipose tissue, which can cause the levels of Rab4B to be reduced, further leading to insulin resistance and dysfunctional adipose tissue.
