= Transcytosis =

Type of cellular transport

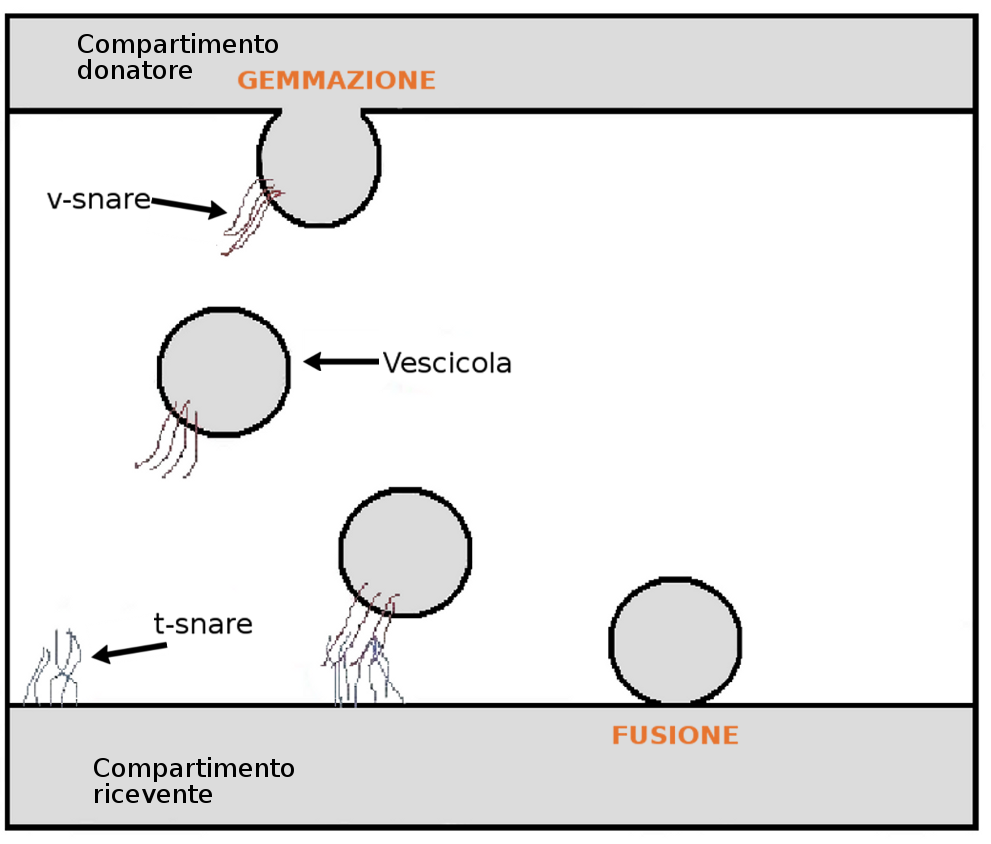

Transcytosis (also known as cytopempsis) is a type of transcellular transport in which various macromolecules are transported across the interior of a cell. Macromolecules are captured in vesicles on one side of the cell, drawn across the cell, and ejected on the other side. Examples of macromolecules transported include IgA, transferrin, and insulin. While transcytosis is most commonly observed in epithelial cells, the process is also present elsewhere. Blood capillaries are a well-known site for transcytosis, though it occurs in other cells, including neurons, osteoclasts and microfold cells of the intestine.

== Regulation ==
The regulation of transcytosis varies greatly due to the many different tissues in which this process is observed. Various tissue-specific mechanisms of transcytosis have been identified. Brefeldin A, a commonly used inhibitor of endoplasmic reticulum-to-Golgi apparatus transport, has been shown to inhibit transcytosis in dog kidney cells, which provided the first clues as to the nature of transcytosis regulation. Transcytosis in dog kidney cells has also been shown be regulated at the apical membrane by Rab17, as well as Rab11a and Rab25. Further work on dog kidney cells has shown that a signaling cascade involving the phosphorylation of EGFR by Yes leading to the activation of Rab11FIP5 by MAPK1 upregulates transcytosis. Transcytosis has been shown to be inhibited by the combination of progesterone and estradiol followed by activation mediated by prolactin in the rabbit mammary gland during pregnancy. In the thyroid, follicular cell transcytosis is regulated positively by TSH. The phosphorylation of caveolin 1 induced by hydrogen peroxide has been shown to be critical to the activation of transcytosis in pulmonary vascular tissue. It can therefore be concluded that the regulation of transcytosis is a complex process that varies between tissues.

== Role in pathogenesis ==
Due to the function of transcytosis as a process that transports macromolecules across cells, it can be a convenient mechanism by which pathogens can invade a tissue. Transcytosis has been shown to be critical to the entry of Cronobacter sakazakii across the intestinal epithelium as well as the blood–brain barrier. Listeria monocytogenes has been shown to enter the intestinal lumen via transcytosis across goblet cells. Shiga toxin secreted by enterohemorrhagic E. coli has been shown to be transcytosed into the intestinal lumen. From these examples, it can be said that transcytosis is vital to the process of pathogenesis for a variety of infectious agents.

Transcytosis is also a suspected mechanism in atherosclerosis by which low density lipoprotein (LDL) macromolecules penetrate across endothelial cell monolayers of arterial walls, which is thought to occur via binding of LDL particles to scavenger receptor B1 and an eight amino-acid cytoplasmic domain on the receptor that recruits guanine nucleotide exchange factor dedicator of cytokinesis 4 (DOCK4). DOCK4 promotes the transport of LDL particles across the endothelial cell monolayers by activating RAC1, a small signalling GTPase whose activation results in the coupling of LDL particles to scavenger receptor B1, allowing internalization of this complex and therefore delivery of LDL carriers of cholesterol into the arterial intima.

== Clinical applications ==
Pharmaceutical companies, such as Lundbeck, are currently exploring the use of transcytosis as a mechanism for transporting therapeutic drugs across the human blood–brain barrier (BBB). Exploiting the body's own transport mechanism can help to overcome the high selectivity of the BBB, which typically blocks the uptake of most therapeutic antibodies into the brain and central nervous system (CNS). The pharmaceutical company Genentech, after having synthesized a therapeutic antibody that effectively inhibited BACE1 enzymatic function, experienced problems transferring adequate, efficient levels of the antibody within the brain. BACE1 is the enzyme which processes amyloid precursor proteins into amyloid-β peptides, including the species that aggregate to form amyloid plaques associated with Alzheimer's disease.

Molecules are transported across an epithelial or endothelial barrier by one of two routes: 1) a transcellular route through the intracellular compartment of the cell, or 2) a paracellular route through the extracellular space between adjacent cells. The transcellular route is also called transcytosis. Transcytosis can be receptor-mediated and consists of three steps: 1) receptor-mediated endocytosis of the molecule on one side of the cell, e.g. the luminal side; 2) movement of the molecule through the intracellular compartment typically within the endosomal system; and 3) exocytosis of the molecule to the extracellular space on the other side of the cell, e.g. the abluminal side.

Transcytosis may be either unidirectional or bidirectional. Unidirectional transcytosis may occur selectively in the luminal to abluminal direction, or in the reverse direction, in the abluminal to luminal direction.

Transcytosis is prominent in brain microvascular peptide and protein transport, because the brain microvascular endothelium, which forms the blood-brain barrier in vivo, expresses unique, epithelial-like, high-resistance tight junctions. The brain endothelial tight junctions virtually eliminate the paracellular pathway of solute transport across the microvascular endothelial wall in brain. In contrast, the endothelial barrier in peripheral organs does not express tight junctions, and solute movement through the paracellular pathway is prominent at the endothelial barrier in organs other than the brain or spinal cord.

Receptor-mediated transcytosis, or RMT, across the BBB is a potential pathway for drug delivery to the brain, particularly for biologic drugs such as recombinant proteins. The non-transportable drug, or therapeutic protein, is genetically fused to a transporter protein. The transporter protein may be an endogenous peptide, or peptidomimetic monoclonal antibody, which undergoes RMT across the BBB via transport on brain endothelial receptors such as the insulin receptor or transferrin receptor. The transporter protein acts as a molecular Trojan horse to ferry into brain the therapeutic protein that is genetically fused to the receptor-specific Trojan horse protein.

Monoclonal antibody Trojan horses that target the BBB insulin or transferrin receptor have been in drug development for over 10 years at ArmaGen, Inc., a biotechnology company in Los Angeles. ArmaGen has developed genetically engineered antibodies against both the insulin and transferrin receptors, and has fused to these antibodies different therapeutic proteins, including lysosomal enzymes, therapeutic antibodies, decoy receptors, and neurotrophins. These therapeutic proteins alone do not cross the BBB, but following genetic fusion to the Trojan horse antibody, the therapeutic protein penetrates the BBB at a rate comparable to small molecules. In 2015, ArmaGen will be the first to enter human clinical trials with the BBB Trojan horse fusion proteins that delivery protein drugs to the brain via the transcytosis pathway. The human diseases initially targeted by ArmaGen are lysosomal storage diseases that adversely affect the brain. Inherited diseases create a condition where a specific lysosomal enzyme is not produced, leading to serious brain conditions including intellectual disability, behavioral problems, and then dementia. Although the missing enzyme can be manufactured by drug companies, the enzyme drug alone does not treat the brain, because the enzyme alone does not cross the BBB. ArmaGen has re-engineered the missing lysosomal enzyme as a Trojan horse-enzyme fusion protein that crosses the BBB. The first clinical trials of the new Trojan horse fusion protein technology will treat the brain in lysosomal storage disorders, including one of the mucopolysaccharidosis type I diseases, (MPSIH), also called Hurler syndrome, and MPS Type II, also called Hunter syndrome.

Researchers at Genentech proposed the creation of a bispecific antibody that could bind the BBB membrane, induce receptor-mediated transcytosis, and release itself on the other side into the brain and CNS. They utilized a mouse bispecific antibody with two active sites performing different functions. One arm had a low-affinity anti-transferrin receptor binding site that induces transcytosis. A high-affinity binding site would result in the antibody not being able to release from the BBB membrane after transcytosis. This way, the amount of transported antibody is based on the concentration of antibody on either side of the barrier. The other arm had the previously developed high-affinity anti-BACE1 binding site that would inhibit BACE1 function and prevent amyloid plaque formation. Genentech was able to demonstrate in mouse models that the new bispecific antibody was able to reach therapeutic levels in the brain. Genentech's method of disguising and transporting the therapeutic antibody by attaching it to a receptor-mediated transcytosis activator has been referred to as the "Trojan Horse" method.
