= RABGEF1 =

Protein-coding gene in the species Homo sapiens

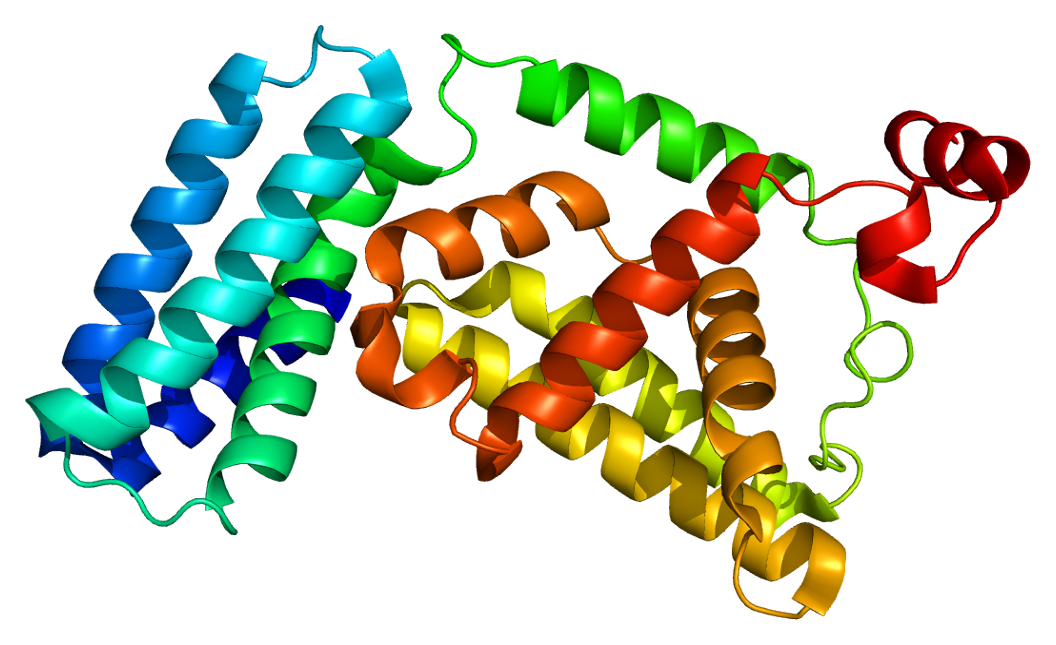

Identifiers
- Aliases: RABGEF1, RABEX5, RAP1, rabex-5, RAB guanine nucleotide exchange factor 1
- External IDs: OMIM: 609700; MGI: 1929459; GeneCards: RABGEF1
Available structures
PDB	Ortholog search: PDBe RCSB
PDB	List of PDB id codes 1TXU, 2C7M, 2C7N, 2OT3, 4N3X, 4N3Y, 4N3Z, 4Q9U

Gene location (Human)
Chr.	Chromosome 7 (human)
Band	7q11.21	Start	66,682,164 bp
Band	7q11.21	End	66,811,464 bp

Gene location (Mouse)
Chr.	Chromosome 5 (mouse)
Band	5|5 G1.3	Start	130,200,639 bp
Band	5|5 G1.3	End	130,243,183 bp
RNA expression pattern
Bgee	Human / Mouse (ortholog); Top expressed in: bone marrow; skin of leg; stromal cell of endometrium; skin of abdomen; gastric mucosa; tibial arteries; blood; vagina; superior frontal gyrus; bone marrow cell / Top expressed in: neural layer of retina; epithelium of lens; retinal pigment epithelium; sternocleidomastoid muscle; triceps brachii muscle; transitional epithelium of urinary bladder; temporal muscle; tibialis anterior muscle; muscle of thigh; digastric muscle; More reference expression data
BioGPS	n/a
Gene ontology
Molecular function	DNA binding; zinc ion binding; metal ion binding; protein binding; ubiquitin protein ligase activity
Cellular component	cytoplasm; recycling endosome; endosome; early endosome; nucleolus; cytosol; early endosome membrane; vesicle
Biological process	endocytosis; protein targeting to membrane; protein transport; negative regulation of protein phosphorylation; negative regulation of leukocyte migration; protein ubiquitination; negative regulation of mast cell activation; negative regulation of mast cell degranulation; negative regulation of Ras protein signal transduction; negative regulation of receptor-mediated endocytosis; negative regulation of inflammatory response; regulation of Fc receptor mediated stimulatory signaling pathway; negative regulation of Kit signaling pathway
Sources:Amigo / QuickGO
Orthologs
Databases	NCBI: entry; OMA: entry
Species	Human	Mouse
Entrez	27342	56715
Ensembl	ENSG00000154710	ENSMUSG00000025340
UniProt	Q9UJ41; Q3HKR1	Q9JM13
RefSeq (mRNA)	NM_001287060; NM_001287061; NM_001287062; NM_014504	NM_001199059; NM_019983; NM_001359233; NM_001378873
RefSeq (protein)	NP_001273989; NP_001273990; NP_001273991; NP_055319; NP_001354651 NP_001354652; NP_001354653; NP_001354654; NP_001354655; NP_001354656; NP_001354657; NP_001354658; NP_001354659; NP_001354660; NP_001354661; NP_001354662; NP_001354663; NP_001354664; NP_001354665; NP_001354666; NP_001354667; NP_001354668; NP_001354669; NP_001354670; NP_001354671; NP_001354672; NP_001354673; NP_001354674; NP_001354675; NP_001354676; NP_001354677; NP_001354678; NP_001354679; NP_001354680; NP_001354681; NP_001354682; NP_001354683; NP_001354684; NP_001354685	NP_001185988; NP_064367; NP_001346162; NP_001365802; NP_001390209 NP_001390210; NP_001390211; NP_001390212
Location (UCSC)	Chr 7: 66.68 – 66.81 Mb	Chr 5: 130.2 – 130.24 Mb
PubMed search
- Wikidata
View/Edit Human	View/Edit Mouse

Rab5 GDP/GTP exchange factor is a protein that in humans is encoded by the RABGEF1 gene.

RABGEF1 forms a complex with rabaptin-5 (RABPT5; MIM 603616) that is required for endocytic membrane fusion, and it serves as a specific guanine nucleotide exchange factor for RAB5(RAB5A; MIM 179512) (Horiuchi et al., 1997) [supplied by OMIM].
