= Rabaptin =

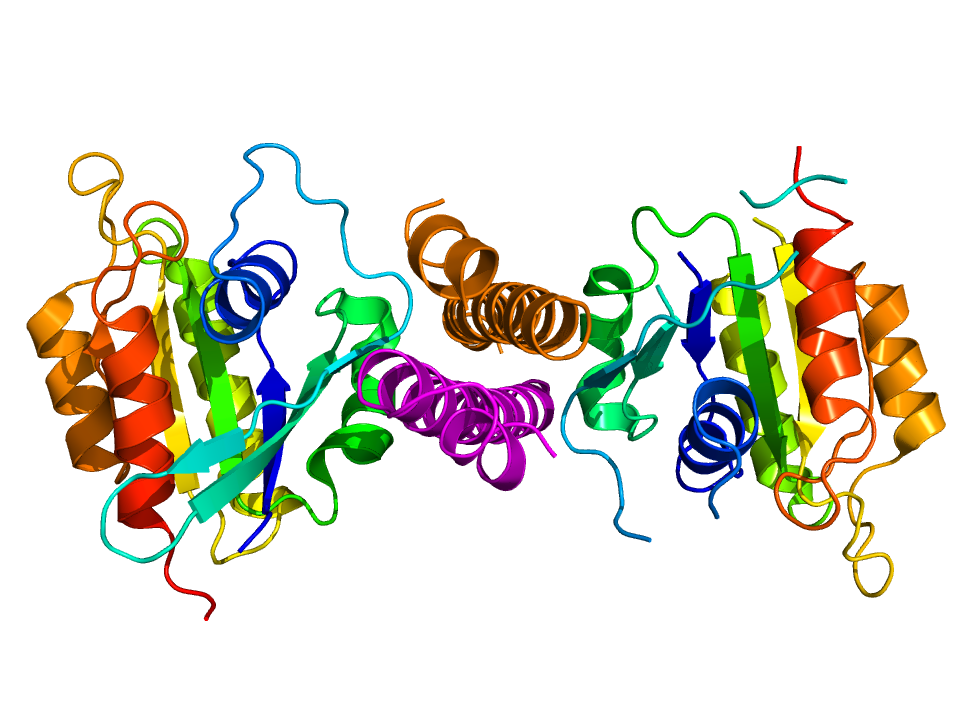
- Crystallographic structure of the C-terminal Rabaptin5 domain homodimer (colored orange and magenta at the center of the figure) complexed with two independent molecules of the GTPase domain of RAB5A (rainbow colored, N-terminus = blue, C-terminus = red).

Identifiers
- Symbol: Rabaptin
- Pfam: PF03528
- InterPro: IPR003914
Available protein structures:
- PDB: 1tu3 1x79 IPR003914 PF03528 (ECOD; PDBsum)
- AlphaFold: IPR003914; PF03528

Rabaptin is a key protein involved in regeneration of injured axons.

Regeneration of injured axons at neuromuscular junctions is regulated by extra-cellular protein factors that promote neurite outgrowth. A novel neurite outgrowth factor from chick denervated skeletal muscle has been cloned and characterised. The protein, termed neurocrescin (rabaptin), has been shown to be secreted in an activity-dependent fashion.

Rabaptin is a 100kDa coiled-coil protein that interacts with the GTP form of the small GTPase Rab5 (see RAB5A, RAB5B, RAB5C) a potent regulator of endocytic transport. It is mainly cytosolic, but a fraction co-localises with Rab5 to early endosomes. Rab5 recruits rabaptin-5 to purified early endosomes in a GTP-dependent manner, demonstrating functional similarities with other members of the Ras family. Immunodepletion of rabaptin-5 from cytosol strongly inhibits Rab5-dependent early endosome membrane fusion. Thus, rabaptin-5 is a Rab effector required for membrane docking and fusion.

Rab5 contributes to early endosome fusion that works through the coordination of other effector proteins, as mentioned above. Rabaptin components may serve to control the SNARE activity which are vital in membrane fusion.

== Structure ==
A crystal structure of the GTPase domain of RAB5A complexed with the C-terminal domain of Rabaptin5 has been determined. The two proteins form a symmetric RAB5A-Rabaptin5 ternary complex with a parallel coiled-coil Rabaptin5 homodimer in the middle complexed with two molecules of Rabaptin5, one on each side (see figure to the right).

== Human proteins ==
RABEP1; RABEP2;
