= RAB11FIP3 =

Protein-coding gene in the species Homo sapiens

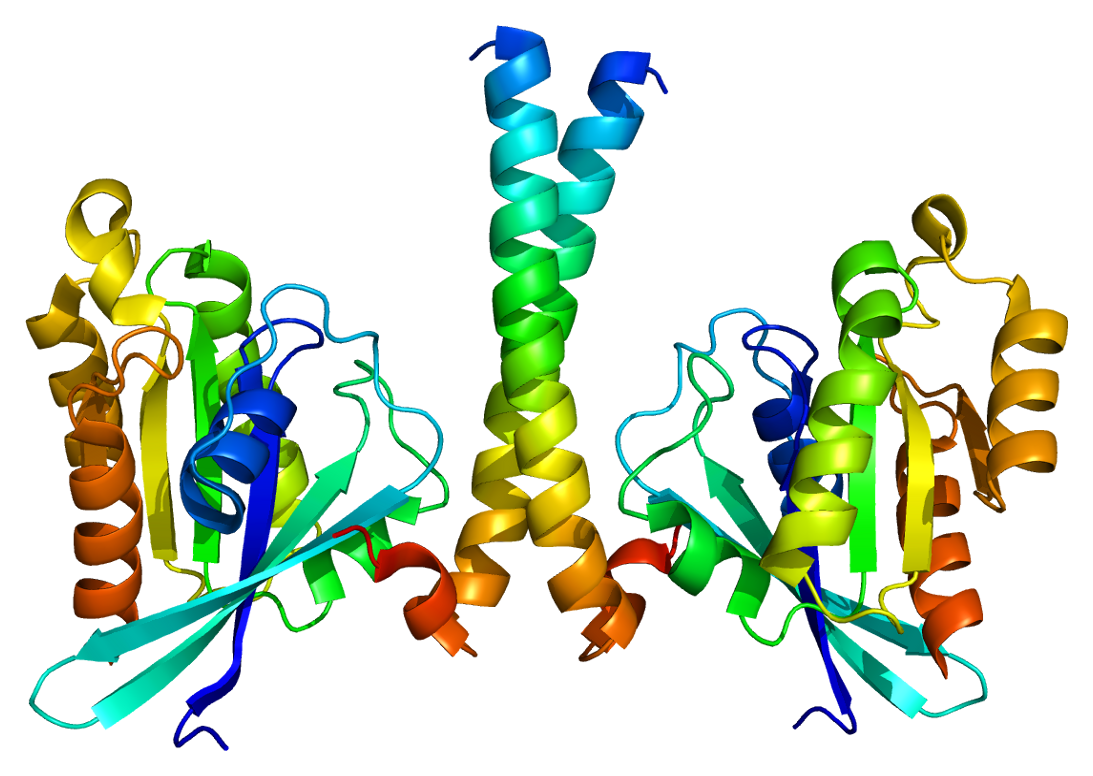

Identifiers
- Aliases: RAB11FIP3, CART1, Rab11-FIP3, RAB11 family interacting protein 3, FIP3-Rab11
- External IDs: OMIM: 608738; MGI: 2444431; GeneCards: RAB11FIP3
Available structures
PDB	Ortholog search: PDBe RCSB
PDB	List of PDB id codes 2D7C, 2HV8, 4D0M, 4UJ3, 4UJ4

Gene location (Human)
Chr.	Chromosome 16 (human)
Band	16p13.3	Start	425,649 bp
Band	16p13.3	End	523,011 bp

Gene location (Mouse)
Chr.	Chromosome 17 (mouse)
Band	17|17 A3.3	Start	26,208,010 bp
Band	17|17 A3.3	End	26,288,529 bp
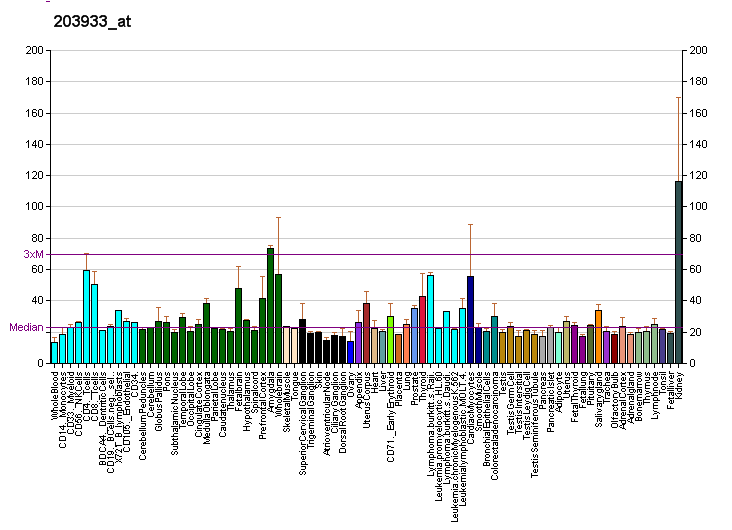
RNA expression pattern
Bgee	Human / Mouse (ortholog); Top expressed in: pancreatic ductal cell; right hemisphere of cerebellum; human kidney; sural nerve; renal medulla; renal cortex; visceral pleura; right frontal lobe; cingulate gyrus; anterior cingulate cortex / Top expressed in: right kidney; proximal tubule; human kidney; knee joint; muscle of thigh; dentate gyrus of hippocampal formation granule cell; primary visual cortex; superior frontal gyrus; skeletal muscle tissue; neural layer of retina; More reference expression data
BioGPS	More reference expression data
Gene ontology
Molecular function	calcium ion binding; protein homodimerization activity; metal ion binding; protein binding; dynein light intermediate chain binding
Cellular component	cytoplasm; recycling endosome; cytosol; endosome; centrosome; intracellular membrane-bounded organelle; membrane; nucleoplasm; microtubule organizing center; recycling endosome membrane; midbody; intercellular bridge; cleavage furrow; cytoskeleton; endocytic vesicle
Biological process	cell division; endocytic recycling; cell cycle; negative regulation of adiponectin secretion; vesicle-mediated transport; cytokinesis; regulation of cytokinesis; protein localization to cilium
Sources:Amigo / QuickGO
Orthologs
Databases	NCBI: entry; OMA: entry
Species	Human	Mouse
Entrez	9727	215445
Ensembl	ENSG00000090565; ENSG00000275338	ENSMUSG00000037098
UniProt	O75154	Q8CHD8
RefSeq (mRNA)	NM_001142272; NM_014700; NM_001370401	NM_001162868; NM_001162869; NM_153140
RefSeq (protein)	NP_001135744; NP_055515; NP_001357330	NP_001156340; NP_001156341; NP_694780
Location (UCSC)	Chr 16: 0.43 – 0.52 Mb	Chr 17: 26.21 – 26.29 Mb
PubMed search
- Wikidata
View/Edit Human	View/Edit Mouse

Rab11 family-interacting protein 3 is a protein that in humans is encoded by the RAB11FIP3 gene.

Proteins of the large Rab GTPase family (see RAB1A; MIM 179508) have regulatory roles in the formation, targeting, and fusion of intracellular transport vesicles. RAB11FIP3 is one of many proteins that interact with and regulate Rab GTPases (Hales et al., 2001).[supplied by OMIM]

== Interactions ==
RAB11FIP3 has been shown to interact with RAB11A.
