= Rabenosyn-5 =

Protein-coding gene in the species Homo sapiens

RBSN
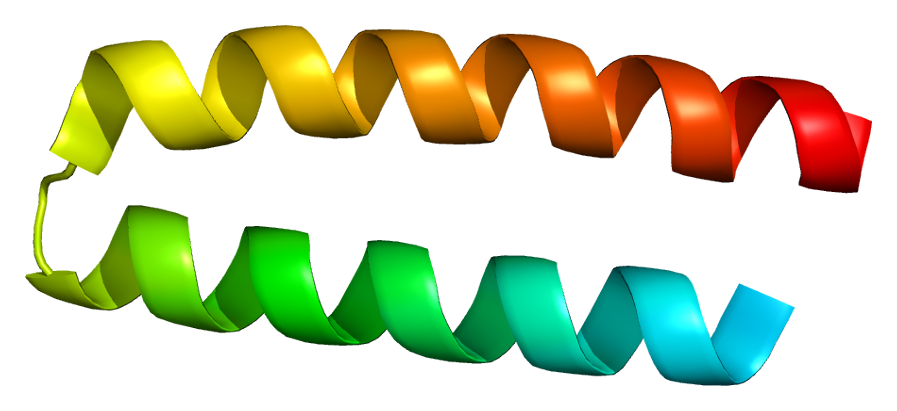

Identifiers
- Aliases: RBSN, Rabenosyn-5, ZFYVE20, rabenosyn, RAB effector
- External IDs: OMIM: 609511; MGI: 1925537; GeneCards: RBSN
Available structures
PDB	Ortholog search: PDBe RCSB
PDB	List of PDB id codes 1YZM, 1Z0J, 1Z0K

Gene location (Human)
Chr.	Chromosome 3 (human)
Band	3p25.1	Start	15,070,073 bp
Band	3p25.1	End	15,099,163 bp

Gene location (Mouse)
Chr.	Chromosome 6 (mouse)
Band	6|6 D1	Start	92,163,693 bp
Band	6|6 D1	End	92,191,906 bp
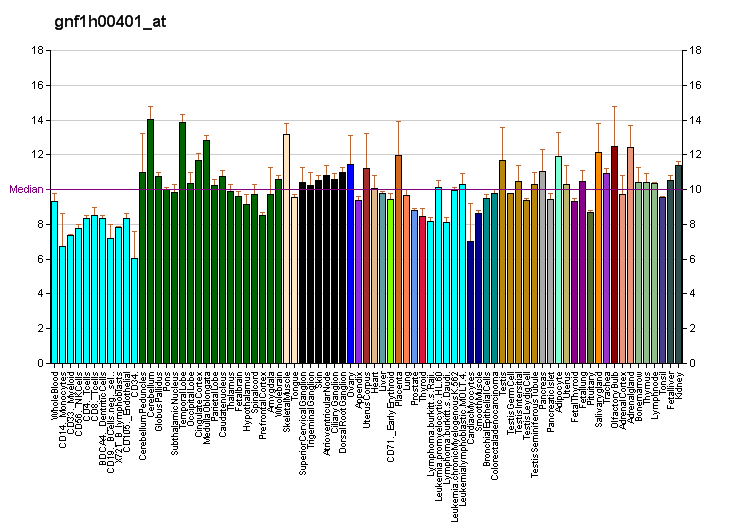
RNA expression pattern
Bgee	Human / Mouse (ortholog); Top expressed in: endothelial cell; myocardium of left ventricle; cardiac muscle tissue of right atrium; skin of arm; tibialis anterior muscle; cerebellar vermis; Brodmann area 23; Brodmann area 46; middle temporal gyrus; internal globus pallidus / Top expressed in: otic vesicle; Rostral migratory stream; supraoptic nucleus; hand; otolith organ; utricle; lumbar subsegment of spinal cord; medullary collecting duct; nucleus of stria terminalis; ascending aorta; More reference expression data
BioGPS	More reference expression data
Gene ontology
Molecular function	zinc ion binding; metal ion binding; protein binding; nucleic acid binding
Cellular component	endosome; early endosome membrane; intracellular membrane-bounded organelle; membrane; cytoplasmic side of endosome membrane; plasma membrane; endosome membrane; extracellular exosome; cytosol
Biological process	endosomal vesicle fusion; endocytosis; vacuole inheritance; Golgi to endosome transport; blood coagulation; endosomal transport; protein transport; regulation of Golgi organization; Golgi to lysosome transport; early endosome to Golgi transport; transport
Sources:Amigo / QuickGO
Orthologs
Databases	NCBI: entry; OMA: entry
Species	Human	Mouse
Entrez	64145	78287
Ensembl	ENSG00000131381	ENSMUSG00000014550
UniProt	Q9H1K0	Q80Y56
RefSeq (mRNA)	NM_001302378; NM_022340	NM_030081
RefSeq (protein)	NP_001289307; NP_071735	NP_084357
Location (UCSC)	Chr 3: 15.07 – 15.1 Mb	Chr 6: 92.16 – 92.19 Mb
PubMed search
- Wikidata
View/Edit Human	View/Edit Mouse

Rabenosyn-5 is a protein that in humans is encoded by the RBSN gene (previously ZFYVE20). Rabenosyn-5 is important for the fusion and recycling of endosomes. As part of this, it acts as an effector for RAB4A/RAB5A.

== Interactions ==
Rabenosyn-5 has been shown to interact with RAB5A.
