= RAB11FIP1 =

Protein-coding gene in the species Homo sapiens

Identifiers
- Aliases: RAB11FIP1, NOEL1A, RCP, rab11-FIP1, RAB11 family interacting protein 1
- External IDs: OMIM: 608737; MGI: 1923017; GeneCards: RAB11FIP1
Available structures
PDB	Ortholog search: PDBe RCSB
PDB	List of PDB id codes 4D0G

Gene location (Human)
Chr.	Chromosome 8 (human)
Band	8p11.23	Start	37,858,618 bp
Band	8p11.23	End	37,899,497 bp

Gene location (Mouse)
Chr.	Chromosome 8 (mouse)
Band	8|8 A2	Start	27,628,801 bp
Band	8|8 A2	End	27,664,674 bp
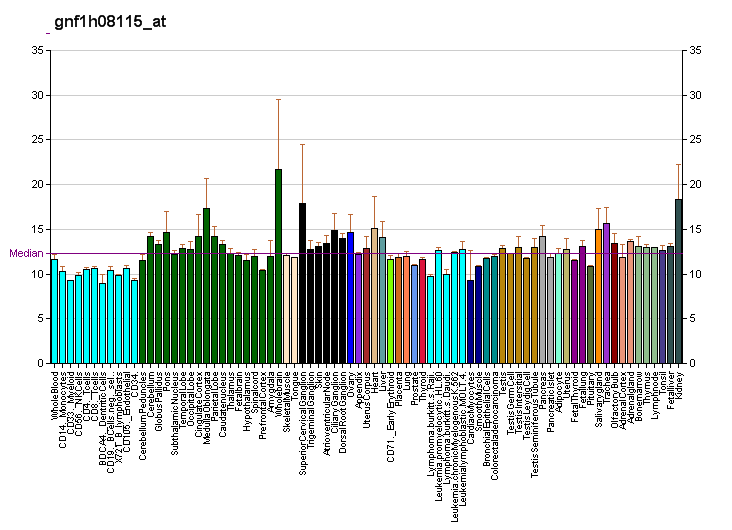

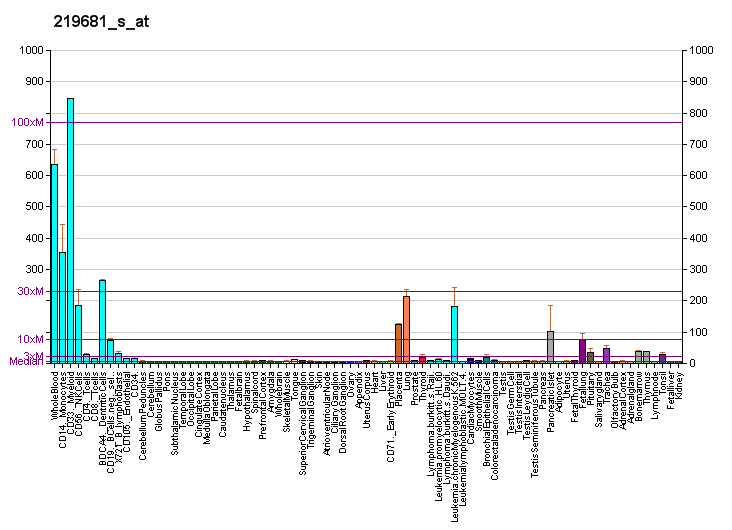
RNA expression pattern
Bgee	Human / Mouse (ortholog); Top expressed in: lower lobe of lung; amniotic fluid; bronchial epithelial cell; oral cavity; islet of Langerhans; jejunal mucosa; mucosa of ileum; mucosa of colon; mucosa of sigmoid colon; nasal epithelium / Top expressed in: granulocyte; zygote; tail of embryo; lip; secondary oocyte; esophagus; primary oocyte; morula; jejunum; stomach; More reference expression data
BioGPS	More reference expression data
Gene ontology
Molecular function	protein binding
Cellular component	cytoplasm; recycling endosome; endosome; phagocytic vesicle membrane; membrane; cytoplasmic vesicle; cytosol; intracellular membrane-bounded organelle
Biological process	protein transport; regulated exocytosis; negative regulation of adiponectin secretion
Sources:Amigo / QuickGO
Orthologs
Databases	NCBI: entry; OMA: entry
Species	Human	Mouse
Entrez	80223	75767
Ensembl	ENSG00000156675	ENSMUSG00000031488
UniProt	Q6WKZ4	Q9D620
RefSeq (mRNA)	NM_025151; NM_001002233; NM_001002814	NM_001080813; NM_029423
RefSeq (protein)	NP_001002814; NP_079427	NP_001074282; NP_083699
Location (UCSC)	Chr 8: 37.86 – 37.9 Mb	Chr 8: 27.63 – 27.66 Mb
PubMed search
- Wikidata
View/Edit Human	View/Edit Mouse

Rab11 family-interacting protein 1 (Rab11-FIP1) also known as Rab-coupling protein is a protein that in humans is encoded by the RAB11FIP1 gene.

== Function ==
Proteins of the large Rab GTPase family (see for example RAB1A) have regulatory roles in the formation, targeting, and fusion of intracellular transport vesicles. RAB11FIP1 is one of many proteins that interact with and regulate Rab GTPases. RAB11FIP1 has been identified as a novel protein involved in the regulation of adiponectin trafficking and release from the adipocyte. RAB11FIP1 expression, which is increased with increasing BMI in humans, inhibits the release of adiponectin from the adipocyte, potentially contributing to lower circulating levels of adiponectin observed in obese populations.

== Interactions ==
RAB11FIP1 has been shown to interact with RAB11A and RAB4A.
