= GOLGA5 =

Protein-coding gene in the species Homo sapiens

Identifiers
- Aliases: GOLGA5, GOLIM5, RFG5, ret-II, golgin A5, GOLGIN 84
- External IDs: OMIM: 606918; MGI: 1351475; GeneCards: GOLGA5

Gene location (Human)
Chr.	Chromosome 14 (human)
Band	14q32.12	Start	92,794,305 bp
Band	14q32.12	End	92,839,947 bp

Gene location (Mouse)
Chr.	Chromosome 12 (mouse)
Band	12|12 E	Start	102,435,394 bp
Band	12|12 E	End	102,464,166 bp
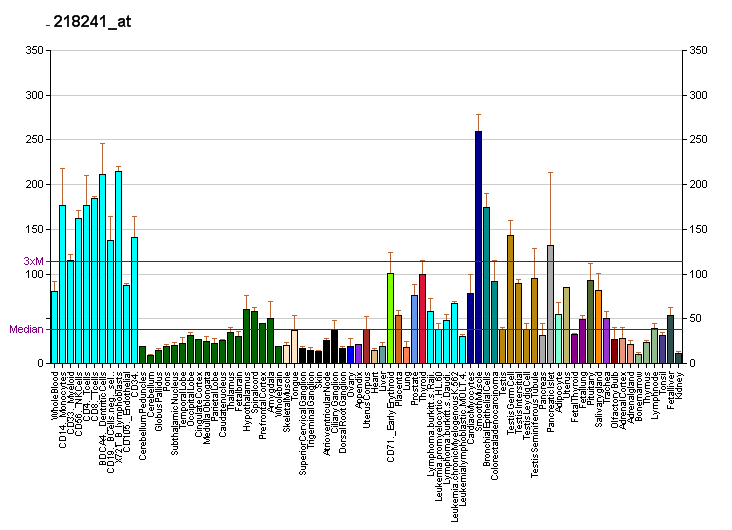
RNA expression pattern
Bgee	Human / Mouse (ortholog); Top expressed in: secondary oocyte; islet of Langerhans; Achilles tendon; parotid gland; olfactory zone of nasal mucosa; rectum; skin of hip; right lobe of liver; body of pancreas; corpus epididymis / Top expressed in: zygote; secondary oocyte; calvaria; parotid gland; primary oocyte; temporal muscle; right ventricle; ankle; stroma of bone marrow; triceps brachii muscle; More reference expression data
BioGPS	More reference expression data
Gene ontology
Molecular function	protein homodimerization activity
Cellular component	cis-Golgi network; Golgi cisterna; membrane; Golgi apparatus; transport vesicle; Golgi membrane; integral component of membrane
Biological process	Golgi vesicle transport; Golgi organization; retrograde transport, vesicle recycling within Golgi
Sources:Amigo / QuickGO
Orthologs
Databases	NCBI: entry; OMA: entry
Species	Human	Mouse
Entrez	9950	27277
Ensembl	ENSG00000066455	ENSMUSG00000021192
UniProt	Q8TBA6	Q9QYE6
RefSeq (mRNA)	NM_005113	NM_001199004; NM_013747
RefSeq (protein)	NP_005104	NP_001185933; NP_038775
Location (UCSC)	Chr 14: 92.79 – 92.84 Mb	Chr 12: 102.44 – 102.46 Mb
PubMed search
- Wikidata
View/Edit Human	View/Edit Mouse

Golgin subfamily A member 5 is a protein that in humans is encoded by the GOLGA5 gene.

The Golgi apparatus, which participates in glycosylation and transport of proteins and lipids in the secretory pathway, consists of a series of stacked cisternae (flattened membrane sacs). Interactions between the Golgi and microtubules are thought to be important for the reorganization of the Golgi after it fragments during mitosis. This gene encodes a member of the golgin family of proteins, whose members localize to the Golgi. This protein is a coiled-coil membrane protein that has been postulated to play a role in vesicle tethering and docking. Translocations involving this gene and the ret proto-oncogene have been found in tumor tissues; the chimeric sequences have been designated RET-II and PTC5.

== Interactions ==
GOLGA5 has been shown to interact with RAB1A.
