= RAB11FIP4 =

Protein-coding gene in the species Homo sapiens

Identifiers
- Aliases: RAB11FIP4, RAB11-FIP4, RAB11 family interacting protein 4, FIP4-Rab11
- External IDs: OMIM: 611999; MGI: 2442920; GeneCards: RAB11FIP4

Gene location (Human)
Chr.	Chromosome 17 (human)
Band	17q11.2	Start	31,391,675 bp
Band	17q11.2	End	31,538,211 bp

Gene location (Mouse)
Chr.	Chromosome 11 (mouse)
Band	11 B5|11 46.88 cM	Start	79,482,038 bp
Band	11 B5|11 46.88 cM	End	79,588,849 bp
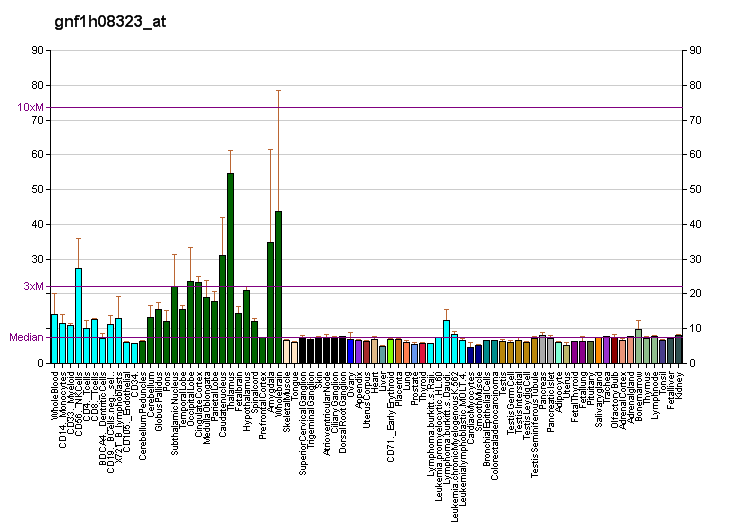

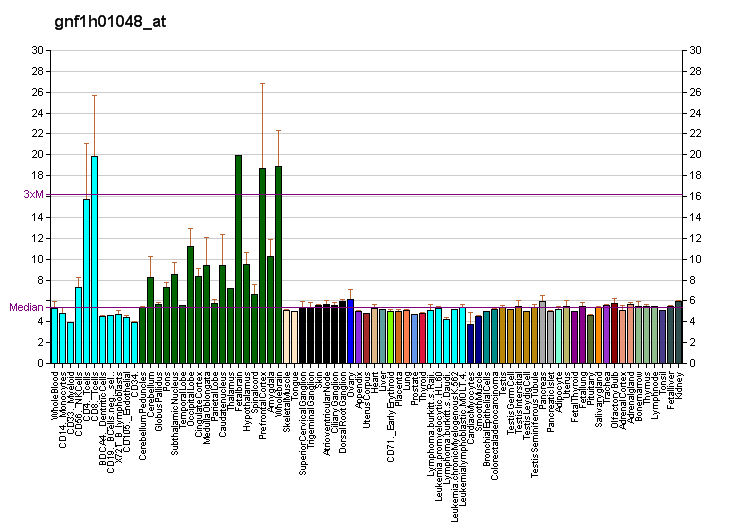
RNA expression pattern
Bgee	Human / Mouse (ortholog); Top expressed in: prefrontal cortex; left testis; right testis; corpus callosum; C1 segment; putamen; right frontal lobe; postcentral gyrus; Brodmann area 46; dorsolateral prefrontal cortex / Top expressed in: superior colliculus; visual cortex; dentate gyrus of hippocampal formation granule cell; medial dorsal nucleus; primary visual cortex; primary motor cortex; superior frontal gyrus; olfactory tubercle; piriform cortex; medial geniculate nucleus; More reference expression data
BioGPS	More reference expression data
Gene ontology
Molecular function	calcium ion binding; protein homodimerization activity; metal ion binding; protein binding
Cellular component	cytoplasm; endosome; membrane; endocytic vesicle; spindle; microtubule organizing center; recycling endosome membrane; midbody; perinuclear region of cytoplasm; cleavage furrow; cytoskeleton; cytoplasmic vesicle; extracellular space; intracellular membrane-bounded organelle; centrosome
Biological process	positive regulation of G1 to G0 transition; cytokinesis; viral process; neural retina development; transport; endocytic recycling; regulation of cytokinesis
Sources:Amigo / QuickGO
Orthologs
Databases	NCBI: entry; OMA: entry
Species	Human	Mouse
Entrez	84440	268451
Ensembl	ENSG00000131242	ENSMUSG00000017639
UniProt	Q86YS3	Q8BQP8
RefSeq (mRNA)	NM_001303542; NM_001346747; NM_001346748; NM_001346749; NM_032932	NM_175543
RefSeq (protein)	NP_001290471; NP_001333676; NP_001333677; NP_001333678; NP_116321	NP_780752
Location (UCSC)	Chr 17: 31.39 – 31.54 Mb	Chr 11: 79.48 – 79.59 Mb
PubMed search
- Wikidata
View/Edit Human	View/Edit Mouse

Rab11 family-interacting protein 4 is a protein that in humans is encoded by the RAB11FIP4 gene.

== Interactions ==
RAB11FIP4 has been shown to interact with RAB11A.
