= Kinesin-associated protein 3 =

Protein found in humans

KIFAP3

Identifiers
- Aliases: KIFAP3, FLA3, KAP-1, KAP-3, KAP3, SMAP, Smg-GDS, dJ190I16.1, kinesin associated protein 3
- External IDs: OMIM: 601836; MGI: 107566; GeneCards: KIFAP3

Gene location (Human)
Chr.	Chromosome 1 (human)
Band	1q24.2	Start	169,921,326 bp
Band	1q24.2	End	170,085,208 bp

Gene location (Mouse)
Chr.	Chromosome 1 (mouse)
Band	1|1 H2.1	Start	163,607,152 bp
Band	1|1 H2.1	End	163,744,678 bp
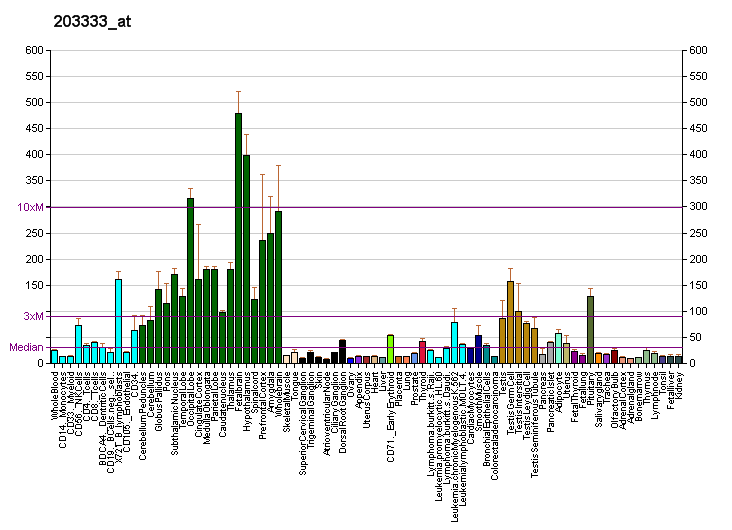
RNA expression pattern
Bgee	Human / Mouse (ortholog); Top expressed in: pons; orbitofrontal cortex; lateral nuclear group of thalamus; Brodmann area 46; frontal pole; postcentral gyrus; prefrontal cortex; ganglionic eminence; sperm; dorsolateral prefrontal cortex / Top expressed in: barrel cortex; facial motor nucleus; nucleus accumbens; prefrontal cortex; subiculum; pontine nuclei; temporal lobe; medial dorsal nucleus; anterior horn of spinal cord; superior colliculus; More reference expression data
BioGPS	More reference expression data
Gene ontology
Molecular function	protein binding; kinesin binding; intraciliary transport particle B binding; protein phosphatase binding
Cellular component	intraciliary transport particle; ciliary basal body; cytosol; centrosome; Golgi apparatus; kinesin complex; microtubule cytoskeleton; kinesin II complex; photoreceptor connecting cilium; condensed nuclear chromosome; ciliary tip; spindle microtubule; endoplasmic reticulum; periciliary membrane compartment; axoneme; cilium
Biological process	protein localization; plus-end-directed vesicle transport along microtubule; antigen processing and presentation of exogenous peptide antigen via MHC class II; negative regulation of apoptotic process; microtubule-based movement; positive regulation of calcium-dependent cell-cell adhesion; microtubule-based process; signal transduction; negative regulation of cell population proliferation; retrograde vesicle-mediated transport, Golgi to endoplasmic reticulum; intraciliary transport involved in cilium assembly; protein-containing complex assembly
Sources:Amigo / QuickGO
Orthologs
Databases	NCBI: entry; OMA: entry
Species	Human	Mouse
Entrez	22920	16579
Ensembl	ENSG00000075945	ENSMUSG00000026585
UniProt	Q92845	P70188
RefSeq (mRNA)	NM_001204514; NM_001204516; NM_001204517; NM_014970; NM_001375830 NM_001375831	NM_010629; NM_001305643
RefSeq (protein)	NP_001191443; NP_001191445; NP_001191446; NP_055785; NP_001362759 NP_001362760	NP_001292572; NP_034759
Location (UCSC)	Chr 1: 169.92 – 170.09 Mb	Chr 1: 163.61 – 163.74 Mb
PubMed search
- Wikidata
View/Edit Human	View/Edit Mouse

Kinesin-associated protein 3 (KAP3) is a protein that in humans is encoded by the KIFAP3 gene. It is a non-motor, accessory subunit which co-oligomerizes with the motor subunits KIF3A and KIF3B or KIF3C, to form heterotrimeric kinesin-2 motor proteins. Kinesin-2 KAP subunits were initially characterized in echinoderms and mice.

== Function ==
The small G protein GDP dissociation stimulator (smg GDS) is a regulator protein having two activities on a group of small G proteins including the Rho and Rap1 family members and Ki-Ras; one is to stimulate their GDP/GTP exchange reactions, and the other is to inhibit their interactions with membranes. The protein encoded by this gene contains 9 armadillo repeats and interacts with the smg GDS protein through these repeats. This protein, which is highly concentrated around the endoplasmic reticulum, is phosphorylated by v-src, and this phosphorylation reduces the affinity of the protein for smg GDS. It is thought that this protein serves as a linker between human chromosome-associated polypeptide (HCAP) and KIF3A/B, a kinesin superfamily protein in the nucleus, and that it plays a role in the interaction of chromosomes with an ATPase motor protein. It has also been proposed to act as a clamp, stabilizing the C-terminal half of the otherwise unstable stalk coiled-coil.

== Interactions ==
KIFAP3 has been shown to interact with APC, SMC3 and RAP1GDS1.
