= RAP1GDS1 =

Protein-coding gene in humans

Identifiers
- Aliases: RAP1GDS1, GDS1, SmgGDS, Rap1 GTPase-GDP dissociation stimulator 1
- External IDs: OMIM: 179502; MGI: 2385189; GeneCards: RAP1GDS1

Gene location (Human)
Chr.	Chromosome 4 (human)
Band	4q23	Start	98,261,384 bp
Band	4q23	End	98,443,861 bp

Gene location (Mouse)
Chr.	Chromosome 3 (mouse)
Band	3|3 H1	Start	138,631,663 bp
Band	3|3 H1	End	138,780,962 bp
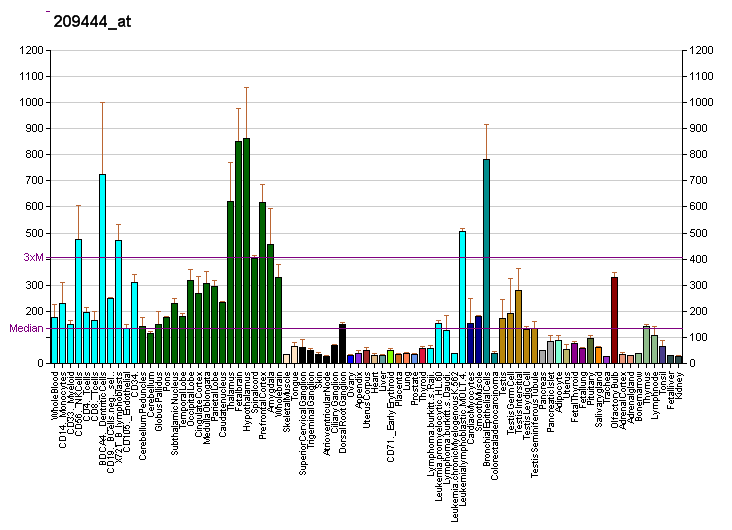

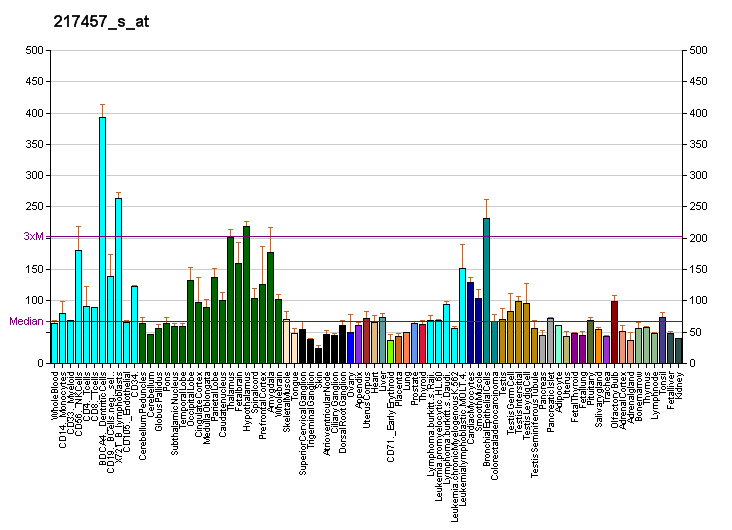
RNA expression pattern
Bgee	Human / Mouse (ortholog); Top expressed in: lateral nuclear group of thalamus; pons; pars compacta; trigeminal ganglion; pars reticulata; middle temporal gyrus; spinal ganglia; superior vestibular nucleus; sperm; corpus callosum / Top expressed in: medial dorsal nucleus; medial geniculate nucleus; lateral geniculate nucleus; perirhinal cortex; inferior colliculi; olfactory epithelium; visual cortex; pontine nuclei; primary motor cortex; CA3 field; More reference expression data
BioGPS	More reference expression data
Gene ontology
Molecular function	protein binding; GTPase activator activity
Cellular component	cytosol; extracellular exosome; endoplasmic reticulum; mitochondrion
Biological process	negative regulation of endoplasmic reticulum calcium ion concentration; positive regulation of mitochondrial calcium ion concentration; vascular associated smooth muscle contraction; myosin filament assembly; small GTPase mediated signal transduction; positive regulation of GTPase activity
Sources:Amigo / QuickGO
Orthologs
Databases	NCBI: entry; OMA: entry
Species	Human	Mouse
Entrez	5910	229877
Ensembl	ENSG00000138698	ENSMUSG00000028149
UniProt	P52306	E9Q912
RefSeq (mRNA)	NM_001100426; NM_001100427; NM_001100428; NM_001100429; NM_001100430 NM_021159	NM_001040690; NM_001286759; NM_145544; NM_001356388
RefSeq (protein)	NP_001093896; NP_001093897; NP_001093898; NP_001093899; NP_001093900 NP_066982	NP_001035780; NP_001273688; NP_001343317; NP_663519
Location (UCSC)	Chr 4: 98.26 – 98.44 Mb	Chr 3: 138.63 – 138.78 Mb
PubMed search
- Wikidata
View/Edit Human	View/Edit Mouse

Rap1 GTPase-GDP dissociation stimulator 1 is an enzyme that in humans is encoded by the RAP1GDS1 gene.

== Interactions ==
RAP1GDS1 has been shown to interact with KIFAP3, HRAS and RHOA.
