= CHML (gene) =

Protein-coding gene in humans

Identifiers
- Aliases: CHML, REP2, choroideremia-like (Rab escort protein 2), CHM like, Rab escort protein 2, CHM like Rab escort protein
- External IDs: OMIM: 118825; MGI: 101913; GeneCards: CHML

Gene location (Human)
Chr.	Chromosome 1 (human)
Band	1q43	Start	241,628,851 bp
Band	1q43	End	241,640,369 bp

Gene location (Mouse)
Chr.	Chromosome 1 (mouse)
Band	1 H3|1 81.7 cM	Start	175,509,803 bp
Band	1 H3|1 81.7 cM	End	175,520,467 bp
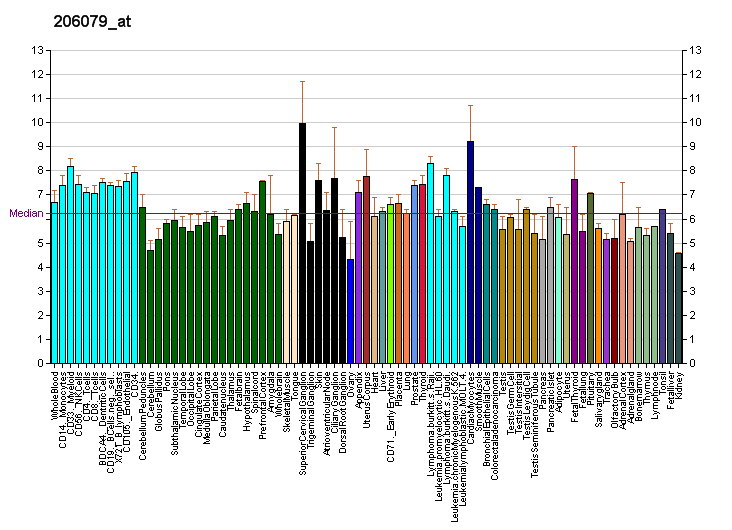
RNA expression pattern
Bgee	Human / Mouse (ortholog); Top expressed in: sperm; ganglionic eminence; Brodmann area 23; postcentral gyrus; ventricular zone; visceral pleura; superior frontal gyrus; placenta; testicle; primary visual cortex / Top expressed in: superior cervical ganglion; vestibular membrane of cochlear duct; hand; supraoptic nucleus; lumbar spinal ganglion; atrium; tail of embryo; substantia nigra; lateral geniculate nucleus; trigeminal ganglion; More reference expression data
BioGPS	More reference expression data
Gene ontology
Molecular function	GTPase activator activity; GDP-dissociation inhibitor activity
Cellular component	nucleoplasm; Rab-protein geranylgeranyltransferase complex; cytoplasm; cytosol; nucleus
Biological process	positive regulation of GTPase activity; intracellular protein transport; protein geranylgeranylation; regulation of catalytic activity; small GTPase mediated signal transduction; post-translational protein modification; vesicle-mediated transport
Sources:Amigo / QuickGO
Orthologs
Databases	NCBI: entry; OMA: entry
Species	Human	Mouse
Entrez	1122	12663
Ensembl	ENSG00000203668	ENSMUSG00000078185
UniProt	P26374	Q9QZD5
RefSeq (mRNA)	NM_001821; NM_001381853; NM_001381854	NM_021350
RefSeq (protein)	NP_001812; NP_001368782; NP_001368783	NP_067325
Location (UCSC)	Chr 1: 241.63 – 241.64 Mb	Chr 1: 175.51 – 175.52 Mb
PubMed search
- Wikidata
View/Edit Human	View/Edit Mouse

Rab proteins geranylgeranyltransferase component A 2 is an enzyme that in humans is encoded by the CHML gene.

The product of the CHML gene supports geranylgeranylation of most Rab proteins and may substitute for REP-1 in tissues other than retina. CHML is localized close to the gene for Usher syndrome type II.

== Interactions ==
CHML (gene) has been shown to interact with RAB1A and RAB5A.
