= KIF3A =

Protein-coding gene in humans

Identifiers
- Aliases: KIF3A, FLA10, KLP-20, kinesin family member 3A
- External IDs: OMIM: 604683; MGI: 107689; GeneCards: KIF3A

Gene location (Human)
Chr.	Chromosome 5 (human)
Band	5q31.1	Start	132,692,628 bp
Band	5q31.1	End	132,737,638 bp

Gene location (Mouse)
Chr.	Chromosome 11 (mouse)
Band	11 B1.3|11 31.97 cM	Start	53,458,206 bp
Band	11 B1.3|11 31.97 cM	End	53,492,794 bp
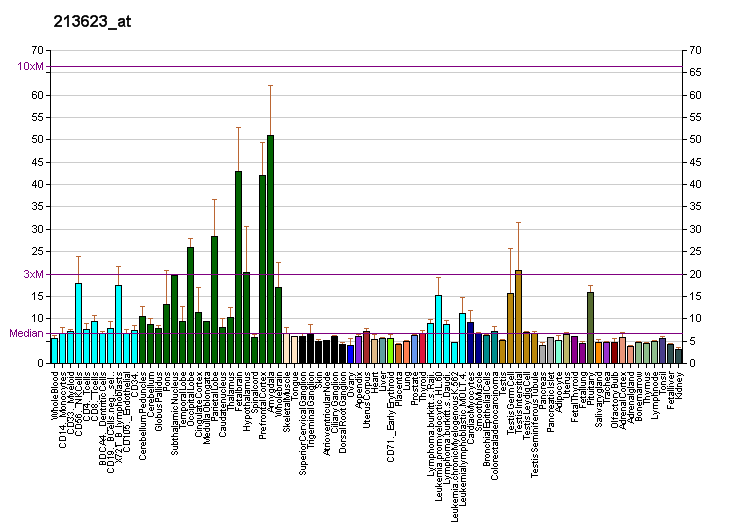
RNA expression pattern
Bgee	Human / Mouse (ortholog); Top expressed in: Brodmann area 23; endothelial cell; middle temporal gyrus; secondary oocyte; pons; buccal mucosa cell; entorhinal cortex; postcentral gyrus; superior vestibular nucleus; sural nerve / Top expressed in: ventromedial nucleus; genital tubercle; anterior amygdaloid area; lateral septal nucleus; mammillary body; dorsomedial hypothalamic nucleus; lens; paraventricular nucleus of hypothalamus; supraoptic nucleus; medial vestibular nucleus; More reference expression data
BioGPS	More reference expression data
Gene ontology
Molecular function	nucleotide binding; microtubule motor activity; spectrin binding; microtubule binding; protein binding; plus-end-directed microtubule motor activity; ATP binding; ATPase activity; protein phosphatase binding
Cellular component	cytoplasm; cytosol; centrosome; cell projection; microtubule cytoskeleton; kinesin II complex; ciliary tip; spindle microtubule; extracellular exosome; cytoskeleton; microtubule; centriole; cilium; kinesin complex; axon cytoplasm
Biological process	plus-end-directed vesicle transport along microtubule; antigen processing and presentation of exogenous peptide antigen via MHC class II; organelle organization; microtubule-based movement; cell projection organization; retrograde vesicle-mediated transport, Golgi to endoplasmic reticulum; neurogenesis; centriole-centriole cohesion; microtubule anchoring at centrosome; intraciliary transport involved in cilium assembly; cilium assembly; axon guidance; anterograde axonal transport; protein transport; protein localization to cell junction
Sources:Amigo / QuickGO
Orthologs
Databases	NCBI: entry; OMA: entry
Species	Human	Mouse
Entrez	11127	16568
Ensembl	ENSG00000131437	ENSMUSG00000018395
UniProt	Q9Y496	P28741
RefSeq (mRNA)	NM_001300791; NM_001300792; NM_007054	NM_001290805; NM_001290806; NM_008443
RefSeq (protein)	NP_001287720; NP_001287721; NP_008985	NP_001277734; NP_001277735; NP_032469
Location (UCSC)	Chr 5: 132.69 – 132.74 Mb	Chr 11: 53.46 – 53.49 Mb
PubMed search
- Wikidata
View/Edit Human	View/Edit Mouse

Kinesin-like protein KIF3A is a protein that in humans is encoded by the KIF3A gene.

== Function ==
KIF3A is one subunit of the heterotrimeric motor protein, kinesin-2, that was initially isolated from sea urchin egg/embryo cytosol using microtubule affinity purification. This motor consists of two kinesin-related subunits (called KIF3A and KIF3B or 3C in vertebrates) and an associated protein (KAP3), and it transports protein complexes, nucleic acids and organelles towards the "plus" ends of microtubule tracks within cells. Work done in a broad range of eukaryotic cells has revealed that heterotrimeric kinesin-2 is the primary motor protein driving the intraflagellar transport of tubulins and other axonemal building blocks from the base of the ciliary/flagellar axoneme to their site of assembly at the distal tips. This process is required for cilium assembly/maintenance and cilium-based signalling which play key roles in various cell and developmental processes. For example, in vertebrate embryos, kinesin-2 function is required for cilia-dependent nodal flow and the development of left-right asymmetry.

== Interactions ==
KIF3A has been shown to interact with MAP3K10.
