= RAB25 =

Protein-coding gene in humans

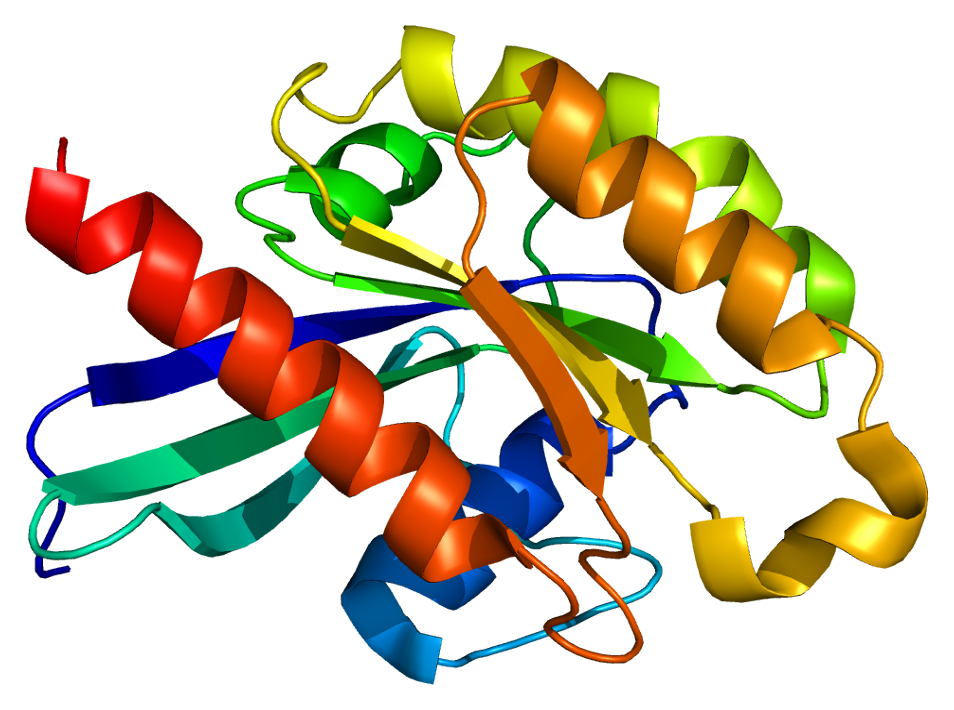

Identifiers
- Aliases: RAB25, CATX-8, RAB11C, member RAS oncogene family
- External IDs: OMIM: 612942; MGI: 1858203; GeneCards: RAB25
Available structures
PDB	Ortholog search: PDBe RCSB
PDB	List of PDB id codes 2OIL, 3TSO
Enzyme activity
EC #	BRENDA	ExPASy	KEGG	MetaCyc
3.6.5.2	↗	↗	↗	↗

Gene location (Human)
Chr.	Chromosome 1 (human)
Band	1q22	Start	156,061,160 bp
Band	1q22	End	156,070,504 bp

Gene location (Mouse)
Chr.	Chromosome 3 (mouse)
Band	3|3 F1	Start	88,449,336 bp
Band	3|3 F1	End	88,455,607 bp
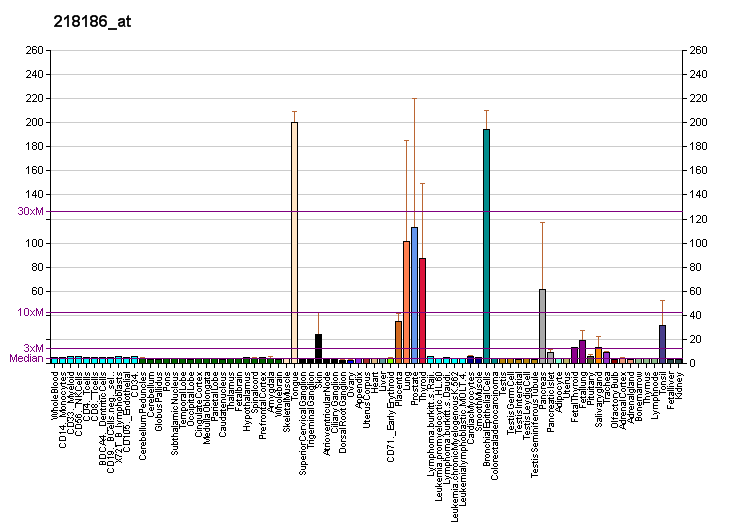
RNA expression pattern
Bgee	Human / Mouse (ortholog); Top expressed in: mucosa of transverse colon; skin of abdomen; skin of leg; gums; mucosa of pharynx; gingival epithelium; skin of thigh; oral cavity; rectum; human penis / Top expressed in: transitional epithelium of urinary bladder; lip; esophagus; epithelium of stomach; left colon; skin of external ear; mucous cell of stomach; cervix; pyloric antrum; duodenum; More reference expression data
BioGPS	More reference expression data
Gene ontology
Molecular function	nucleotide binding; GTP binding; myosin V binding; protein binding; GTPase activity
Cellular component	pseudopodium membrane; plasma membrane; cell projection; pseudopodium; extracellular exosome; cytoplasmic vesicle; membrane; endosome; recycling endosome
Biological process	protein transport; regulation of vesicle-mediated transport; positive regulation of epithelial cell migration; epithelial cell morphogenesis; positive regulation of cell population proliferation; pseudopodium organization; transport; intracellular protein transport; exocytosis; Rab protein signal transduction
Sources:Amigo / QuickGO
Orthologs
Databases	NCBI: entry; OMA: entry
Species	Human	Mouse
Entrez	57111	53868
Ensembl	ENSG00000132698	ENSMUSG00000008601
UniProt	P57735	Q9WTL2
RefSeq (mRNA)	NM_020387	NM_016899
RefSeq (protein)	NP_065120	NP_058595
Location (UCSC)	Chr 1: 156.06 – 156.07 Mb	Chr 3: 88.45 – 88.46 Mb
PubMed search
- Wikidata
View/Edit Human	View/Edit Mouse

Ras-related protein Rab-25 is a protein that in humans is encoded by the RAB25 gene. It is thought to act as a promoter of tumor development.

== Interactions ==
RAB25 has been shown to interact with RAB11FIP2 and RAB11FIP5.
