= RAB11FIP5 =

Protein-coding gene in the species Homo sapiens

Identifiers
- Aliases: RAB11FIP5, GAF1, RIP11, pp75, RAB11 family interacting protein 5, rab11-FIP5, gaf-1
- External IDs: OMIM: 605536; MGI: 1098586; GeneCards: RAB11FIP5

Gene location (Human)
Chr.	Chromosome 2 (human)
Band	2p13.2	Start	73,073,382 bp
Band	2p13.2	End	73,156,721 bp

Gene location (Mouse)
Chr.	Chromosome 6 (mouse)
Band	6 C3|6 37.35 cM	Start	85,311,944 bp
Band	6 C3|6 37.35 cM	End	85,351,616 bp
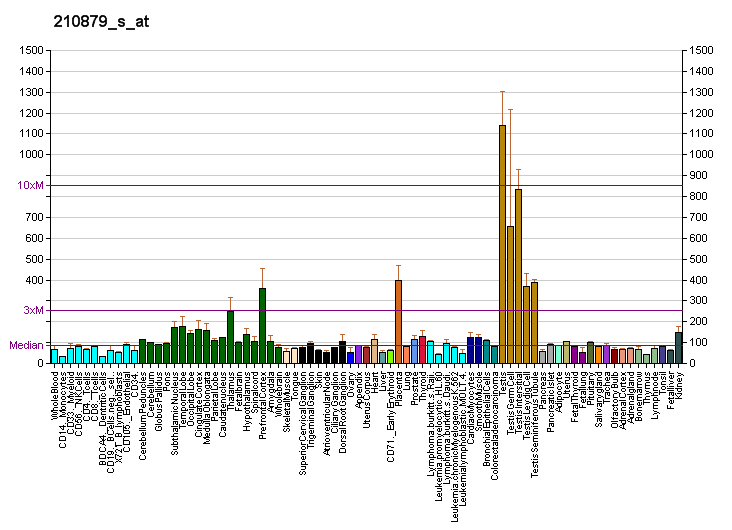
RNA expression pattern
Bgee	Human / Mouse (ortholog); Top expressed in: sperm; left testis; right testis; renal medulla; pons; spinal ganglia; lateral nuclear group of thalamus; human kidney; cartilage tissue; parotid gland / Top expressed in: spermatid; testicle; spermatocyte; urinary bladder; cerebellar cortex; human kidney; primary visual cortex; dentate gyrus of hippocampal formation granule cell; hypothalamus; heart; More reference expression data
BioGPS	More reference expression data
Gene ontology
Molecular function	protein binding; gamma-tubulin binding
Cellular component	cytoplasm; endosome; Golgi apparatus; early endosome membrane; intracellular membrane-bounded organelle; membrane; mitochondrial membranes; Golgi membrane; transport vesicle membrane; microtubule organizing center; mitochondrial outer membrane; recycling endosome membrane; mitochondrion; cytoplasmic vesicle; early endosome; secretory granule; recycling endosome
Biological process	regulation of protein localization to cell surface; cellular response to acidic pH; protein transport; negative regulation of adiponectin secretion; insulin secretion involved in cellular response to glucose stimulus; regulated exocytosis
Sources:Amigo / QuickGO
Orthologs
Databases	NCBI: entry; OMA: entry
Species	Human	Mouse
Entrez	26056	52055
Ensembl	ENSG00000135631	ENSMUSG00000051343
UniProt	Q9BXF6	Q8R361
RefSeq (mRNA)	NM_015470; NM_001371272	NM_001003955; NM_177466
RefSeq (protein)	NP_056285; NP_001358201	NP_001003955; NP_803417
Location (UCSC)	Chr 2: 73.07 – 73.16 Mb	Chr 6: 85.31 – 85.35 Mb
PubMed search
- Wikidata
View/Edit Human	View/Edit Mouse

Rab11 family-interacting protein 5 is a protein that in humans is encoded by the RAB11FIP5 gene.

== Interactions ==
RAB11FIP5 has been shown to interact with RAB11A and RAB25.

== Vesicle trafficking ==
Rab11FIP5 is one of the many proteins that have been shown to interact with the Rab11 protein. Rab GTPases, such as Rab11, are enzymes that are involved in vesicular trafficking. Rab11 specifically plays a key role in endocytic trafficking and recycling through guiding early endosomes to endosome recycling complexes. Rab11FIP5, like most other Rab11FIP proteins, interacts with Rab11 by serving as an adaptor protein. This leads to downstream changes with regards to which proteins can interact. This is a result of the various Rab11FIP proteins that each have different binding partners. This process allows for the coordination and organization of endosomal transport and ultimately gives Rab11 its versatile function in the cell. It is believed that Rab11 recruits specific Rab11FIP proteins to the surface of vesicles in order to determine how the vesicle will behave.

Studies have shown that Rab11FIP5 localizes to the perinuclear endosomes where it aids in sorting vesicles into the slow recycling route. This process involves the transport of cargo proteins, like endocytosed receptors, to endosome recycling complexes and subsequently to the plasma membrane. This is in contrast to the fast constitutive recycling route which allows for the direct transport of cargo from the endosome to the plasma membrane. Rab11FIP5 aids in this sorting process by binding to kinesin II and forming a protein complex to regulate vesicular trafficking. Some of the proteins that are regulated through Rab11FIP5 mediated vesicle trafficking are microtubule proteins and the TfR receptor. This links Rab11FIP5 functionality to the cell cytoskeleton and the iron uptake of a cell, respectively.

== Other functions ==
Rab11FIP5 has been shown to play a role in the nervous system because it functions in neurons. Studies have suggested that Rab11FIP5 is involved in regulating the localization of the postsynaptic AMPA-type glutamate receptor. The AMPA receptor is an excitatory receptor that can be found on the plasma membranes of neurons. Studies have shown that mice with the Rab11FIP5 gene knocked out have severe long term neuronal depression. Without the presence of Rab11FIP5, it is hypothesized that the internalized AMPA receptors cannot be recycled back onto the plasma membrane because the receptors cannot be correctly trafficked to intracellular organelles responsible for recycling.

Rab11FIP5 has also been implicated as a protein involved in the creation of tissue polarity during development. Rab11FIP5 has been shown to be involved in the vesicle trafficking and degradation of proteins used to coordinate embryonic development. This is conducted in a manner that helps maintain the ectoderm polarity in embryonic Drosophila.

Rab11FIP5 is also suggested to be involved in aiding salivary epithelial cells to adjust to extracellular pH. V-ATPase, a proton pump protein, has been shown to be reliant on Rab11FIP5 mediated vesicle trafficking. When Rab11FIP5 is knocked down, salivary cells cannot correctly translocate V-ATPase to the plasma membrane in response to extracellular acidosis. While this pathway remains largely unknown, these results suggest a link between Rab11FIP5 function and the maintenance of the buffering capacity of saliva.

Rab11FIP5 is also required for regulated exocytosis in neuroendocrine cells. Knockdown of Rab11FIP5 inhibited calcium-stimulated dense core vesicle (DCV) exocytosis in a neuroendocrine cell line BON cells. DCV membrane proteins are lost to the plasma membrane during exocytosis and recycle to the Golgi through the retrograde trafficking pathway. The requirement of Rab11FIP5 for regulated DCV exocytosis may be attributed to its role in endosome-mediated retrograde trafficking.
