= RAB5B =

Protein-coding gene in the species Homo sapiens

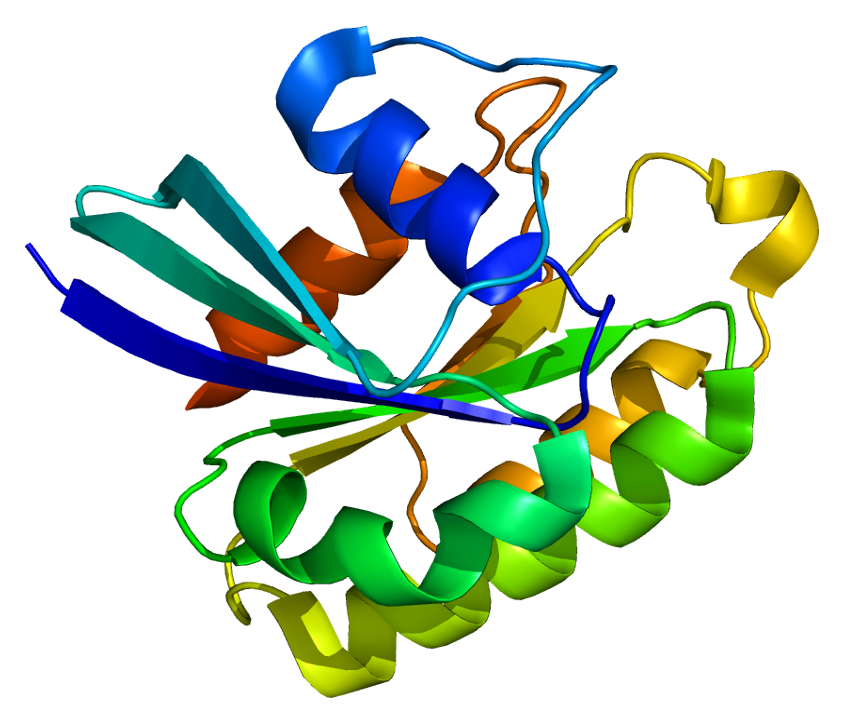

Identifiers
- Aliases: RAB5B, Rab-5B, member RAS oncogene family
- External IDs: OMIM: 179514; MGI: 105938; GeneCards: RAB5B
Available structures
PDB	Ortholog search: PDBe RCSB
PDB	List of PDB id codes 2HEI
Enzyme activity
EC #	BRENDA	ExPASy	KEGG	MetaCyc
3.6.5.2	↗	↗	↗	↗

Gene location (Human)
Chr.	Chromosome 12 (human)
Band	12q13.2	Start	55,973,913 bp
Band	12q13.2	End	55,996,683 bp

Gene location (Mouse)
Chr.	Chromosome 10 (mouse)
Band	10|10 D3	Start	128,513,044 bp
Band	10|10 D3	End	128,532,133 bp
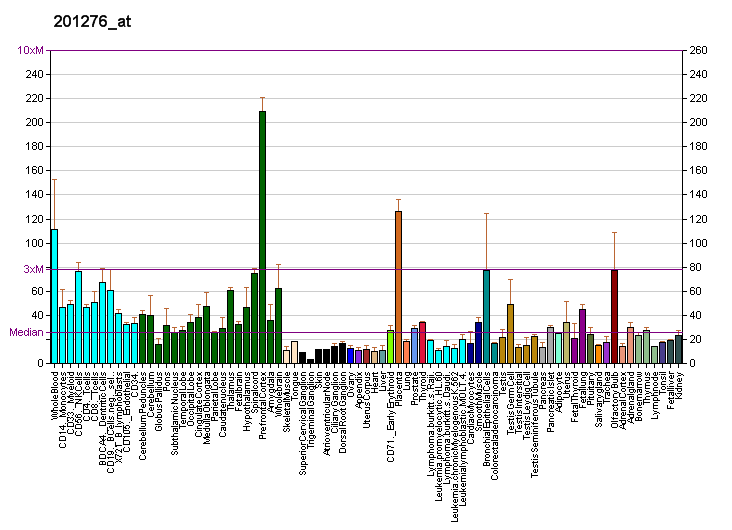
RNA expression pattern
Bgee	Human / Mouse (ortholog); Top expressed in: C1 segment; epithelium of colon; skin of leg; ectocervix; popliteal artery; tibial arteries; skin of abdomen; muscle layer of sigmoid colon; gastric mucosa; right coronary artery / Top expressed in: granulocyte; dentate gyrus of hippocampal formation granule cell; muscle of thigh; lip; primary visual cortex; superior frontal gyrus; esophagus; neural layer of retina; genital tubercle; ventricular zone; More reference expression data
BioGPS	More reference expression data
Gene ontology
Molecular function	nucleotide binding; GDP binding; GTP binding; GTP-dependent protein binding; protein binding; GTPase activity
Cellular component	endosome; membrane; melanosome; endocytic vesicle; intracellular anatomical structure; early endosome; extracellular exosome; plasma membrane; secretory granule membrane; early endosome membrane; intracellular membrane-bounded organelle; anchored component of synaptic vesicle membrane
Biological process	regulation of endocytosis; antigen processing and presentation; endosome organization; plasma membrane to endosome transport; protein transport; neutrophil degranulation; transport; intracellular protein transport; Rab protein signal transduction; endocytosis
Sources:Amigo / QuickGO
Orthologs
Databases	NCBI: entry; OMA: entry
Species	Human	Mouse
Entrez	5869	19344
Ensembl	ENSG00000111540	ENSMUSG00000000711
UniProt	P61020	P61021
RefSeq (mRNA)	NM_001252036; NM_001252037; NM_002868	NM_011229; NM_177411
RefSeq (protein)	NP_001238965; NP_001238966; NP_002859	NP_803130
Location (UCSC)	Chr 12: 55.97 – 56 Mb	Chr 10: 128.51 – 128.53 Mb
PubMed search
- Wikidata
View/Edit Human	View/Edit Mouse

Ras-related protein Rab-5B is a protein that in humans is encoded by the RAB5B gene.
