= KIF3B =

Protein-coding gene in the species Homo sapiens

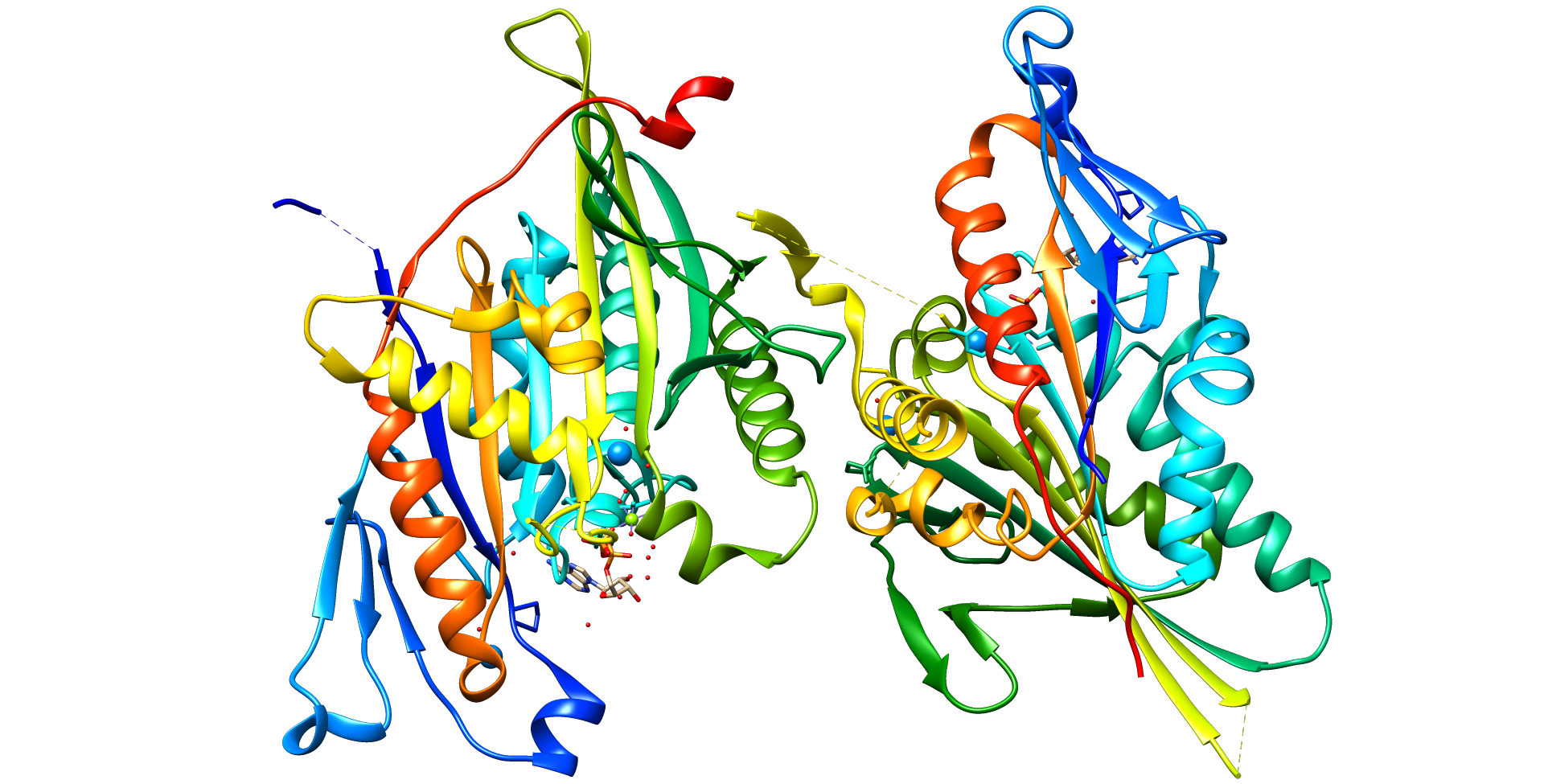

Identifiers
- Aliases: KIF3B, FLA8, HH0048, KLP-11, kinesin family member 3B, RP89
- External IDs: OMIM: 603754; MGI: 107688; GeneCards: KIF3B
Available structures
PDB	Ortholog search: PDBe RCSB
PDB	List of PDB id codes 3B6U

Gene location (Human)
Chr.	Chromosome 20 (human)
Band	20q11.21	Start	32,277,651 bp
Band	20q11.21	End	32,335,011 bp

Gene location (Mouse)
Chr.	Chromosome 2 (mouse)
Band	2 H1|2 75.41 cM	Start	153,133,333 bp
Band	2 H1|2 75.41 cM	End	153,175,310 bp
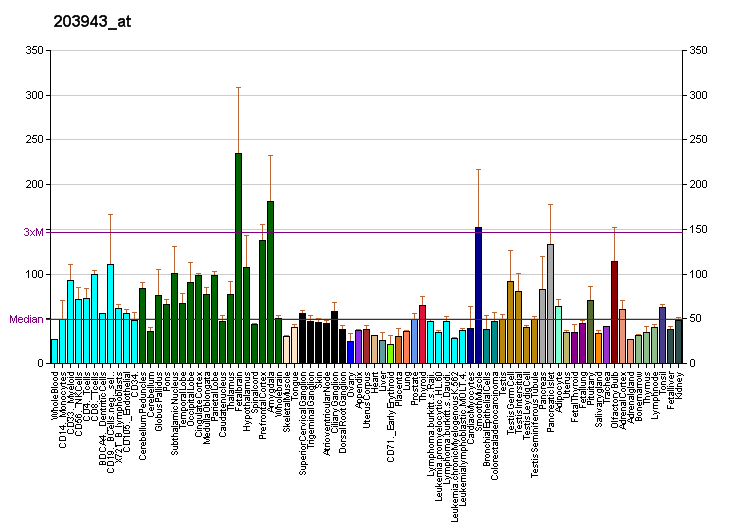
RNA expression pattern
Bgee	Human / Mouse (ortholog); Top expressed in: middle temporal gyrus; islet of Langerhans; sperm; bronchial epithelial cell; renal medulla; jejunal mucosa; secondary oocyte; Brodmann area 23; parietal lobe; superior frontal gyrus / Top expressed in: spermatocyte; spermatid; seminiferous tubule; granulocyte; neural layer of retina; lumbar spinal ganglion; dentate gyrus of hippocampal formation granule cell; retinal pigment epithelium; primary visual cortex; superior frontal gyrus; More reference expression data
BioGPS	More reference expression data
Gene ontology
Molecular function	nucleotide binding; microtubule binding; protein binding; plus-end-directed microtubule motor activity; ATP binding; microtubule motor activity; ATPase activity; intraciliary transport particle B binding
Cellular component	cytoplasm; intraciliary transport particle; cytosol; membrane; microtubule cytoskeleton; spindle; plus-end kinesin complex; midbody; ciliary tip; spindle microtubule; extracellular exosome; cytoskeleton; microtubule; axon cytoplasm; centrosome; kinesin II complex; cell projection; axon; cilium; kinesin complex
Biological process	plus-end-directed vesicle transport along microtubule; antigen processing and presentation of exogenous peptide antigen via MHC class II; mitotic spindle organization; anterograde axonal transport; positive regulation of cytokinesis; mitotic spindle assembly; determination of left/right symmetry; mitotic centrosome separation; retrograde vesicle-mediated transport, Golgi to endoplasmic reticulum; microtubule-based movement; intraciliary transport involved in cilium assembly
Sources:Amigo / QuickGO
Orthologs
Databases	NCBI: entry; OMA: entry
Species	Human	Mouse
Entrez	9371	16569
Ensembl	ENSG00000101350	ENSMUSG00000027475
UniProt	O15066	Q61771
RefSeq (mRNA)	NM_004798	NM_008444
RefSeq (protein)	NP_004789	NP_032470
Location (UCSC)	Chr 20: 32.28 – 32.34 Mb	Chr 2: 153.13 – 153.18 Mb
PubMed search
- Wikidata
View/Edit Human	View/Edit Mouse

Kinesin-like protein KIF3B is a protein that in humans is encoded by the KIF3B gene. KIF3B is an N-type protein that complexes with two other kinesin proteins to form two-headed anterograde motors. First, KIF3B forms a heterodimer with KIF3A (kinesin-like protein KIF3A); (KIF3A/3B), that is membrane-bound and has ATPase activity. Then KIFAP3 (KAP3, kinesin superfamily associated protein–3) binds to the tail domain to form a heterotrimeric motor. This motor has a plus end-directed microtubule sliding activity that exhibits a velocity of ~0.3 μm/s a. There are 14 kinesin protein families in the kinesin superfamily and KIF3B is part of the Kinesin-2 family of kinesins that form heterotrimeric or homodimeric complexes. Expression of the three motor subunits of heterotrimeric kinesin-2 is ubiquitous. The KIF3A/3B/KAP3 motors can transport 90 to 160 nm in diameter organelles.

There are many orthologous KIF3B genes that are expressed in Drosophila, the sea urchin, Bos taurus, Canis familiaris, Equus caballus, Felis catus, Macaca mulatta, Mus musculus, Pan troglodytes, and Rattus norvegicus.

== Function ==
The heterotrimeric KIF3B/KIF3A/KAP3 motor machinery functions in the intracellular transport of multiple different molecules such as β-catenin and MT1-MMP. KIF3B activity has been implicated with various cellular processes such as intracellular movement of organelles, intraflagellar transport, chromosome movement during mitosis and meiosis, and cellular interaction with the extracellular matrix.

KIF3B also regulates the interaction of cancer cells with the extracellular matrix (ECM), in particular the transport of MT1-MMP to the cancer cell front is essential for collagen fiber matrix realignment and degradation.

== Interactions ==
KIF3B has been shown to interact with the SMC3 subunit of the cohesin complex and with RAB4A.
