= RAB4A =

Protein-coding gene in humans

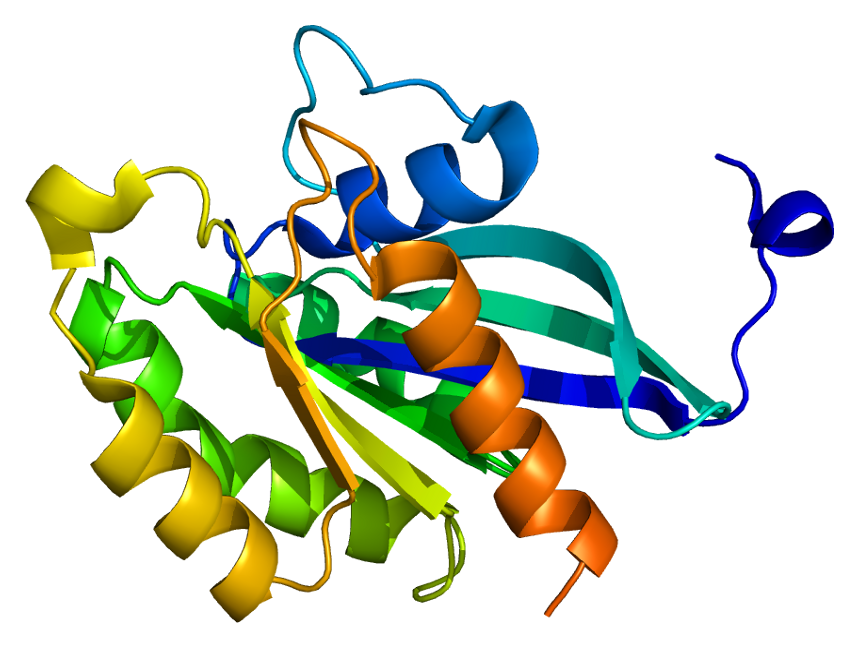

Identifiers
- Aliases: RAB4A, HRES-1, HRES-1/RAB4, HRES1, RAB4, member RAS oncogene family
- External IDs: OMIM: 179511; MGI: 105069; GeneCards: RAB4A
Available structures
PDB	Ortholog search: PDBe RCSB
PDB	List of PDB id codes 1YU9, 1Z0K, 2BMD, 2BME
Enzyme activity
EC #	BRENDA	ExPASy	KEGG	MetaCyc
3.6.5.2	↗	↗	↗	↗

Gene location (Human)
Chr.	Chromosome 1 (human)
Band	1q42.13	Start	229,271,062 bp
Band	1q42.13	End	229,305,894 bp

Gene location (Mouse)
Chr.	Chromosome 8 (mouse)
Band	8 E2|8 72.19 cM	Start	124,532,724 bp
Band	8 E2|8 72.19 cM	End	124,562,026 bp
RNA expression pattern
Bgee	Human / Mouse (ortholog); Top expressed in: lateral nuclear group of thalamus; parotid gland; pars compacta; olfactory zone of nasal mucosa; palpebral conjunctiva; human penis; right ventricle; pars reticulata; endothelial cell; Achilles tendon / Top expressed in: parotid gland; seminal vesicula; lacrimal gland; yolk sac; submandibular gland; right kidney; ascending aorta; cerebellar cortex; left lobe of liver; duodenum; More reference expression data
BioGPS	n/a
Gene ontology
Molecular function	nucleotide binding; GDP binding; ATPase binding; GTP binding; protein binding; GTPase activity; ATPase activator activity; syntaxin binding; ionotropic glutamate receptor binding
Cellular component	cytoplasm; recycling endosome; vesicle; cytosol; endosome; membrane; intracellular membrane-bounded organelle; insulin-responsive compartment; plasma membrane; perinuclear region of cytoplasm; extracellular exosome; cytoplasmic vesicle membrane; postsynaptic recycling endosome; early endosome membrane; recycling endosome membrane; anchored component of synaptic vesicle membrane
Biological process	regulation of endocytosis; antigen processing and presentation; positive regulation of ATP-dependent activity; Rab protein signal transduction; protein transport; phosphatidylinositol biosynthetic process; intracellular protein transport; small GTPase mediated signal transduction
Sources:Amigo / QuickGO
Orthologs
Databases	NCBI: entry; OMA: entry
Species	Human	Mouse
Entrez	5867	19341
Ensembl	ENSG00000168118	ENSMUSG00000019478
UniProt	P20338	P56371
RefSeq (mRNA)	NM_001271998; NM_004578	NM_009003
RefSeq (protein)	NP_001258927; NP_004569; NP_004569.2	NP_033029
Location (UCSC)	Chr 1: 229.27 – 229.31 Mb	Chr 8: 124.53 – 124.56 Mb
PubMed search
- Wikidata
View/Edit Human	View/Edit Mouse

Ras-related protein Rab-4A is a protein that in humans is encoded by the RAB4A gene.

== Interactions ==
RAB4A has been shown to interact with:

- CD2AP,
- KIF3B,
- RAB11FIP1,
- RABEP1, and
- STX4.
