= RAB11A =

Protein-coding gene in the species Homo sapiens

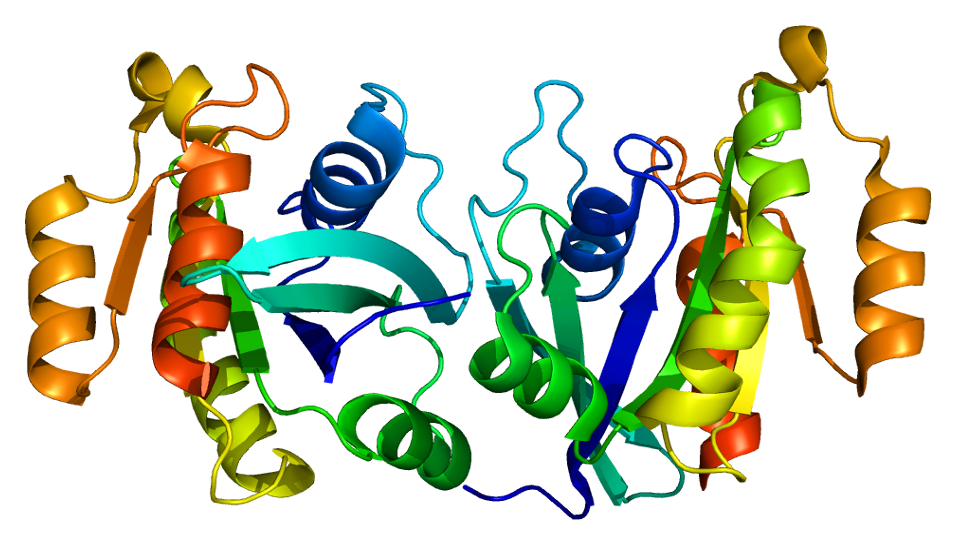

Identifiers
- Aliases: RAB11A, YL8, member RAS oncogene family
- External IDs: OMIM: 605570; MGI: 1858202; GeneCards: RAB11A
Available structures
| PDB | Ortholog search: PDBe RCSB |
| PDB | List of PDB id codes 1OIV, 1OIW, 1OIX, 1YZK, 2D7C, 2GZD, 2GZH, 2HV8, 4C4P, 4D0L, 4D0M, 4LWZ, 4LX0, 4UJ3, 4UJ4, 4UJ5, 5C4G, 5C46, 5EUQ |
Enzyme activity
| EC # | BRENDA | ExPASy | KEGG | MetaCyc |
|---|---|---|---|---|
| 3.6.5.2 | ↗ | ↗ | ↗ | ↗ |

Gene location (Human)
| Chr. | Chromosome 15 (human) |
| Band | 15q22.31 | Start | 65,726,054 bp |
| Band | 15q22.31 | End | 65,891,989 bp |

Gene location (Mouse)
| Chr. | Chromosome 9 (mouse) |
| Band | 9|9 C | Start | 64,622,581 bp |
| Band | 9|9 C | End | 64,645,040 bp |
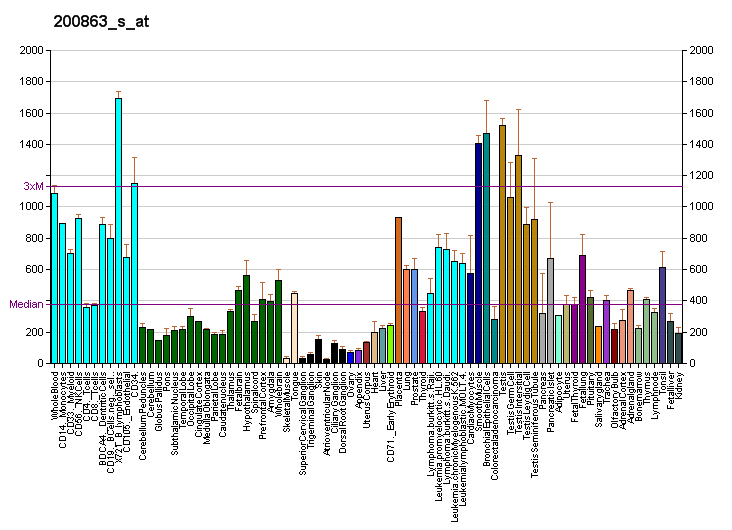

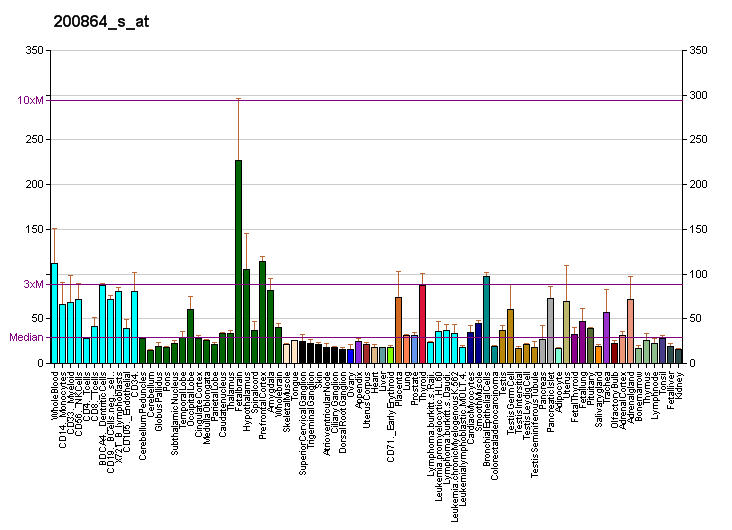
RNA expression pattern
| Bgee | Human / Mouse (ortholog); Top expressed in: gingival epithelium; oral cavity; mucosa of pharynx; vulva; amniotic fluid; skin of thigh; right adrenal gland; right adrenal cortex; rectum; gallbladder / Top expressed in: lip; granulocyte; superior surface of tongue; esophagus; right kidney; corneal stroma; embryo; superior frontal gyrus; atrioventricular valve; ventricular zone; More reference expression data |
| BioGPS | More reference expression data |
Gene ontology
| Molecular function | nucleotide binding; GTP binding; myosin V binding; GTPase activity; microtubule binding; syntaxin binding; protein binding |
| Cellular component | extracellular exosome; transport vesicle; cytoplasm; mitochondrion; multivesicular body; trans-Golgi network; Golgi apparatus; cytosol; kinetochore microtubule; axon; spindle pole; membrane; centrosome; perinuclear region of cytoplasm; plasma membrane; cleavage furrow; cytoplasmic vesicle membrane; cytoplasmic vesicle; vesicle; endosome; phagocytic vesicle; recycling endosome; recycling endosome membrane; postsynaptic recycling endosome; microtubule organizing center; protein-containing complex; intracellular membrane-bounded organelle; Schaffer collateral - CA1 synapse; glutamatergic synapse; intracellular anatomical structure |
| Biological process | regulation of vesicle-mediated transport; positive regulation of G2/M transition of mitotic cell cycle; multivesicular body assembly; cell cycle; astral microtubule organization; regulation of long-term neuronal synaptic plasticity; establishment of protein localization to membrane; cytokinesis; positive regulation of axon extension; establishment of vesicle localization; renal water homeostasis; regulation of multivesicular body size; establishment of protein localization to organelle; neuron projection development; protein localization to plasma membrane; plasma membrane to endosome transport; mitotic spindle assembly; regulation of protein transport; protein transport; mitotic metaphase plate congression; exosomal secretion; vesicle-mediated transport; positive regulation of epithelial cell migration; melanosome transport; ciliary basal body-plasma membrane docking; positive regulation of protein localization to plasma membrane; neurotransmitter receptor transport, endosome to postsynaptic membrane; post-translational protein modification; transport; intracellular protein transport; exocytosis; regulation of cytokinesis; Rab protein signal transduction; vesicle-mediated transport in synapse; amyloid-beta clearance by transcytosis; small GTPase mediated signal transduction |
Sources:Amigo / QuickGO
Orthologs
| Databases | NCBI: entry; OMA: entry |
| Species | Human | Mouse |
| Entrez | 8766 | 53869 |
| Ensembl | ENSG00000103769 | ENSMUSG00000004771 |
| UniProt | P62491 | P62492 |
| RefSeq (mRNA) | NM_004663; NM_001206836 | NM_017382 |
| RefSeq (protein) | NP_001193765; NP_004654 | NP_059078 |
| Location (UCSC) | Chr 15: 65.73 – 65.89 Mb | Chr 9: 64.62 – 64.65 Mb |
| PubMed search |
- Wikidata
| View/Edit Human | View/Edit Mouse |

Ras-related protein Rab-11A is a protein that in humans is encoded by the RAB11A gene.

== Function ==
The protein encoded by this gene belongs to the small GTPase superfamily, Rab family. It is associated with both constitutive and regulated secretory pathways, and may be involved in protein transport.

Rab-11a controls intracellular trafficking of the innate immune receptor TLR4, and thereby also receptor signaling

== Interactions ==
RAB11A has been shown to interact with:

- RAB11FIP1,
- RAB11FIP2,
- RAB11FIP3,
- RAB11FIP4, and
- RAB11FIP5
- Moesin
