= RABEP1 =

Protein-coding gene in the species Homo sapiens

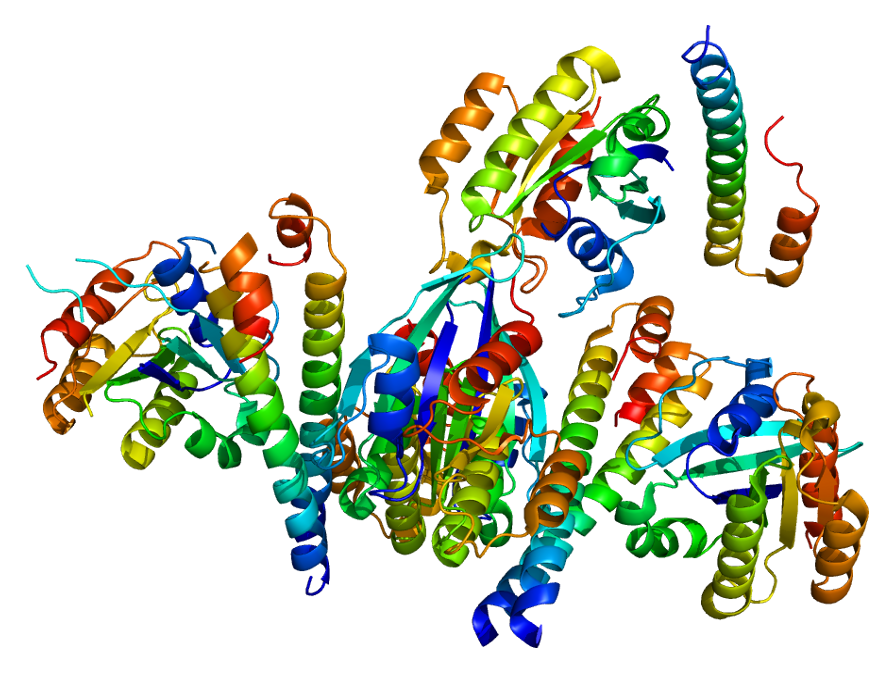
Available structures
PDB	Ortholog search: PDBe RCSB
PDB	List of PDB id codes 1P4U, 1TU3, 1X79, 4N3Y, 4N3Z, 4Q9U

Identifiers
- Aliases: RABEP1, RAB5EP, RABPT5, rabaptin, RAB GTPase binding effector protein 1
- External IDs: OMIM: 603616; MGI: 1860236; HomoloGene: 3451; GeneCards: RABEP1; OMA:RABEP1 - orthologs

Gene location (Human)
Chr.	Chromosome 17 (human)
Band	17p13.2	Start	5,282,265 bp
Band	17p13.2	End	5,386,340 bp

Gene location (Mouse)
Chr.	Chromosome 11 (mouse)
Band	11 B3- B4|11 43.21 cM	Start	70,735,604 bp
Band	11 B3- B4|11 43.21 cM	End	70,833,931 bp
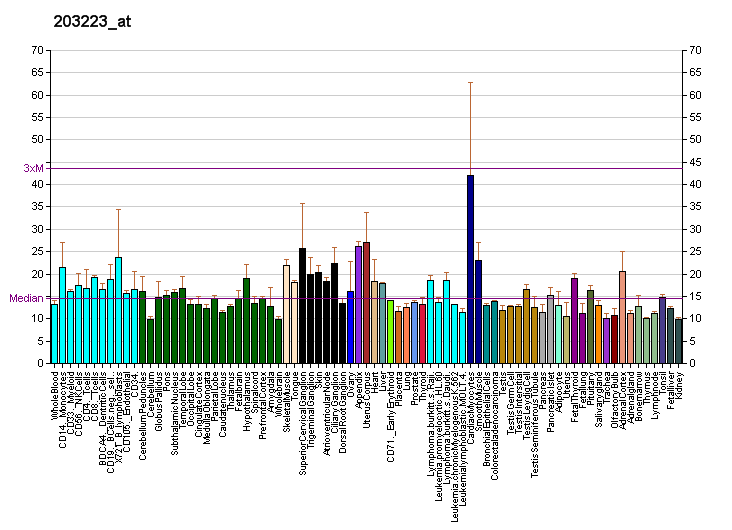

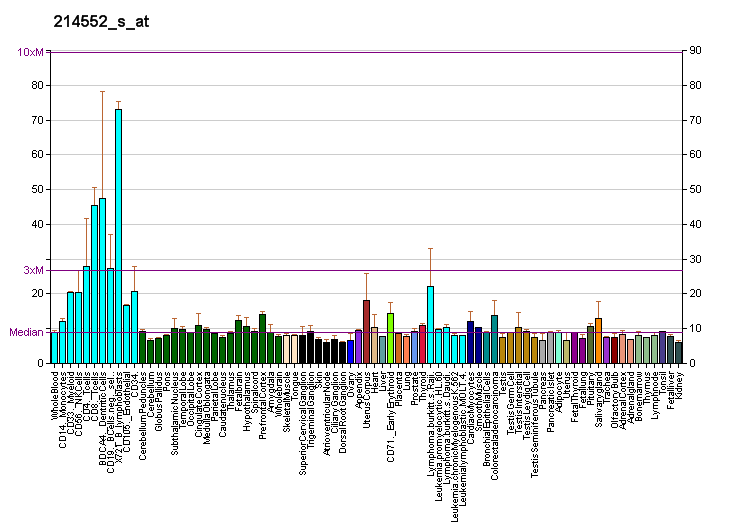
RNA expression pattern
Bgee	Human / Mouse (ortholog); Top expressed in: Skeletal muscle tissue of rectus abdominis; Achilles tendon; biceps brachii; sural nerve; postcentral gyrus; internal globus pallidus; C1 segment; Skeletal muscle tissue of biceps brachii; gastrocnemius muscle; middle temporal gyrus / Top expressed in: dentate gyrus of hippocampal formation granule cell; tail of embryo; substantia nigra; barrel cortex; adrenal gland; genital tubercle; superior frontal gyrus; sciatic nerve; Region I of hippocampus proper; primary visual cortex; More reference expression data
BioGPS	More reference expression data
Gene ontology
Molecular function	growth factor activity; protein homodimerization activity; protein binding; GTPase activator activity; protein domain specific binding
Cellular component	intracellular membrane-bounded organelle; cytoplasmic vesicle; endocytic vesicle; cytoplasm; recycling endosome; endosome; early endosome; early endosome membrane; protein-containing complex
Biological process	membrane fusion; apoptotic process; protein transport; positive regulation of GTPase activity; vesicle-mediated transport; endocytosis; regulation of signaling receptor activity; Golgi to plasma membrane transport; protein localization to ciliary membrane; signal transduction
Sources:Amigo / QuickGO
Orthologs
Species	Human	Mouse
Entrez	9135	54189
Ensembl	ENSG00000029725	ENSMUSG00000020817
UniProt	Q15276	O35551
RefSeq (mRNA)	NM_001083585; NM_001291581; NM_001291582; NM_004703	NM_001291141; NM_001291142; NM_001291143; NM_019400
RefSeq (protein)	NP_001077054; NP_001278510; NP_001278511; NP_004694	NP_001278070; NP_001278071; NP_001278072; NP_062273
Location (UCSC)	Chr 17: 5.28 – 5.39 Mb	Chr 11: 70.74 – 70.83 Mb
PubMed search
- Wikidata
View/Edit Human	View/Edit Mouse

Rab GTPase-binding effector protein 1 is an enzyme that in humans is encoded by the RABEP1 gene. It belongs to rabaptin protein family.

== Interactions ==
RABEP1 has been shown to interact with:

- AP1G1,
- GGA1,
- GGA2,
- RAB4A, and
- RAB5A.
