= RAB1A =

Protein-coding gene in the species Homo sapiens

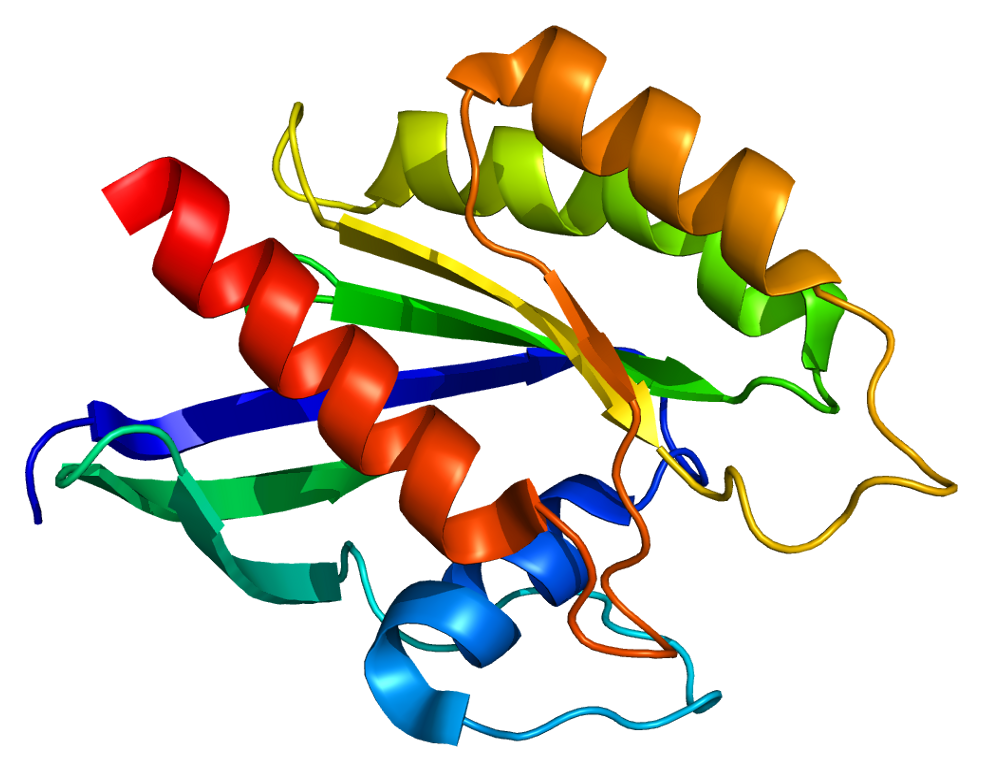

Identifiers
- Aliases: RAB1A, RAB1, YPT1, member RAS oncogene family
- External IDs: OMIM: 179508; MGI: 97842; GeneCards: RAB1A
Available structures
PDB	Ortholog search: PDBe RCSB
PDB	List of PDB id codes 2FOL, 2WWX, 3L0I, 3SFV, 3TKL, 4FMB, 4FMC, 4FMD, 4FME, 4IRU, 4JVS
Enzyme activity
EC #	BRENDA	ExPASy	KEGG	MetaCyc
3.6.5.2	↗	↗	↗	↗

Gene location (Human)
Chr.	Chromosome 2 (human)
Band	2p14	Start	65,070,696 bp
Band	2p14	End	65,130,331 bp

Gene location (Mouse)
Chr.	Chromosome 11 (mouse)
Band	11 A3.1|11 12.92 cM	Start	20,151,432 bp
Band	11 A3.1|11 12.92 cM	End	20,176,856 bp
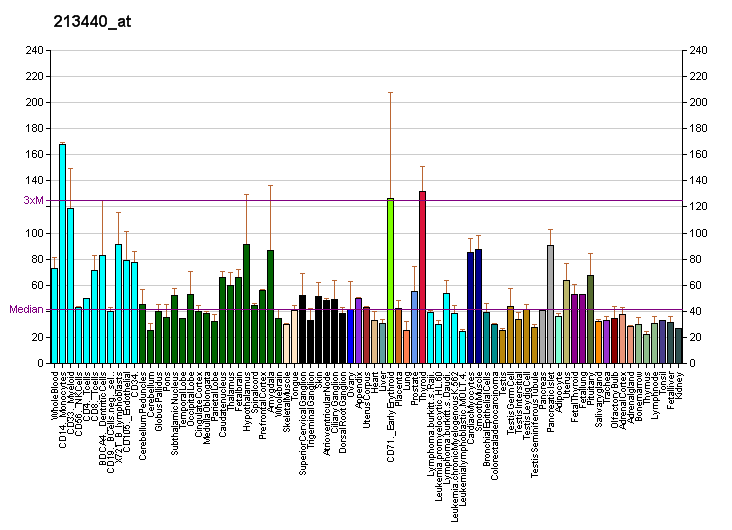

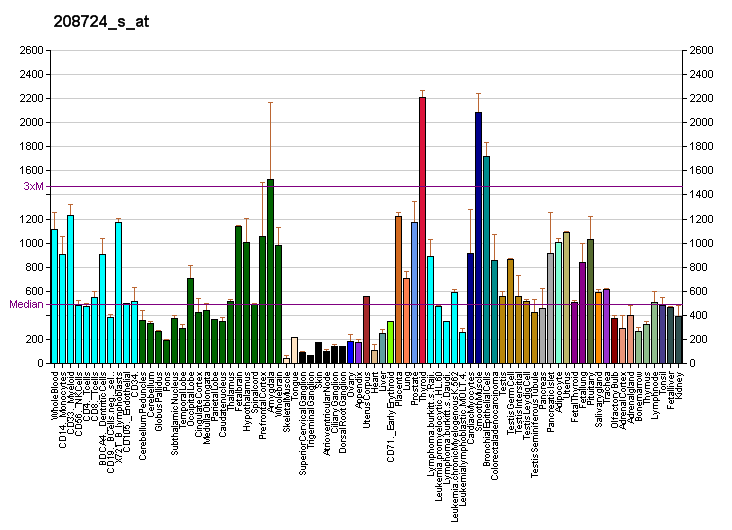

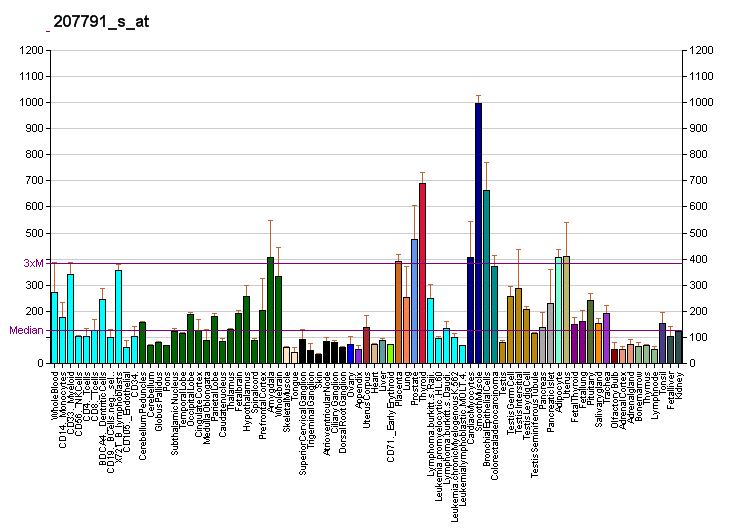
RNA expression pattern
Bgee	Human / Mouse (ortholog); Top expressed in: sperm; skin of thigh; skin of hip; mucosa of sigmoid colon; corpus epididymis; jejunal mucosa; amniotic fluid; caput epididymis; tibia; oral cavity / Top expressed in: calvaria; medial ganglionic eminence; seminal vesicula; stroma of bone marrow; sexually immature organism; molar; urothelium; transitional epithelium of urinary bladder; endothelial cell of lymphatic vessel; parotid gland; More reference expression data
BioGPS	More reference expression data
Gene ontology
Molecular function	nucleotide binding; GTP binding; protein binding; cadherin binding; GTPase activity
Cellular component	cytoplasm; cytosol; endosome; Golgi apparatus; endoplasmic reticulum membrane; membrane; melanosome; Golgi membrane; early endosome; endoplasmic reticulum; extracellular exosome; transport vesicle membrane
Biological process	COPII-coated vesicle cargo loading; endocytosis; establishment of endothelial intestinal barrier; Golgi organization; vesicle transport along microtubule; autophagosome assembly; positive regulation of glycoprotein metabolic process; autophagy; endoplasmic reticulum to Golgi vesicle-mediated transport; COPII vesicle coating; melanosome transport; growth hormone secretion; defense response to bacterium; protein transport; substrate adhesion-dependent cell spreading; cell migration; vesicle-mediated transport; retrograde vesicle-mediated transport, Golgi to endoplasmic reticulum; cilium assembly; positive regulation of ubiquitin protein ligase activity; post-translational protein modification; transport; intracellular protein transport; Rab protein signal transduction
Sources:Amigo / QuickGO
Orthologs
Databases	NCBI: entry; OMA: entry
Species	Human	Mouse
Entrez	5861	19324
Ensembl	ENSG00000138069	ENSMUSG00000020149
UniProt	P62820	P62821
RefSeq (mRNA)	NM_004161; NM_015543	NM_008996
RefSeq (protein)	NP_004152; NP_056358	NP_033022
Location (UCSC)	Chr 2: 65.07 – 65.13 Mb	Chr 11: 20.15 – 20.18 Mb
PubMed search
- Wikidata
View/Edit Human	View/Edit Mouse

Ras-related protein Rab-1A is a protein that in humans is encoded by the RAB1A gene.

== Interactions ==
RAB1A has been shown to interact with:

- CHML,
- GOLGA2,
- GOLGA5,
- MICAL1
- RABAC1, and
- CHM.
