= RAB5A =

Protein-coding gene in the species Homo sapiens

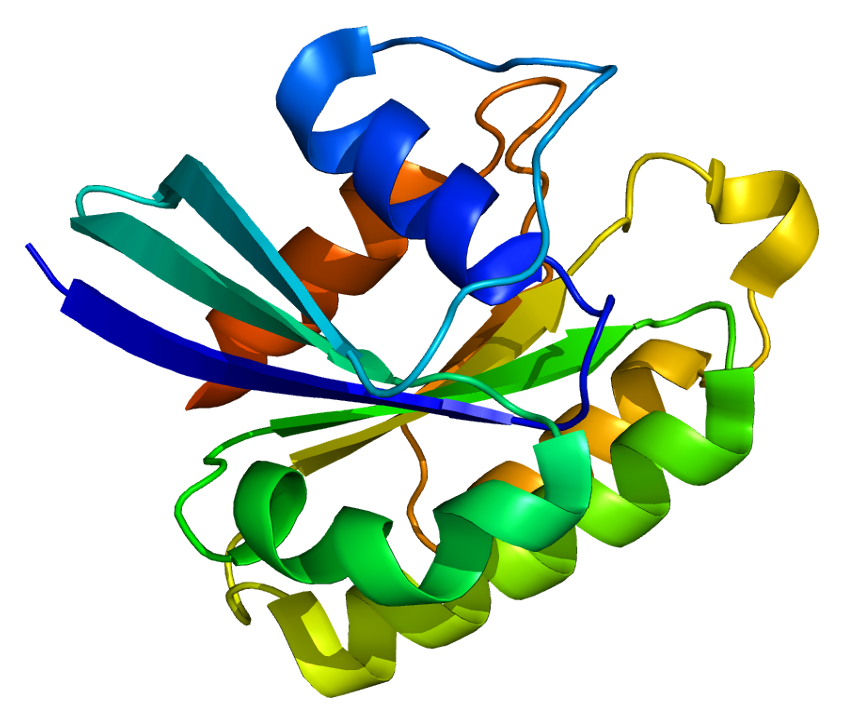

Identifiers
- Aliases: RAB5A, RAB5, member RAS oncogene family
- External IDs: OMIM: 179512; MGI: 105926; GeneCards: RAB5A
Available structures
PDB	Ortholog search: PDBe RCSB
PDB	List of PDB id codes 1N6H, 1N6I, 1N6K, 1N6L, 1N6N, 1N6O, 1N6P, 1N6R, 1R2Q, 1TU3, 1TU4, 3MJH, 4Q9U
Enzyme activity
EC #	BRENDA	ExPASy	KEGG	MetaCyc
3.6.5.2	↗	↗	↗	↗

Gene location (Human)
Chr.	Chromosome 3 (human)
Band	3p24.3	Start	19,947,097 bp
Band	3p24.3	End	19,985,175 bp

Gene location (Mouse)
Chr.	Chromosome 17 (mouse)
Band	17 C|17 27.82 cM	Start	53,786,262 bp
Band	17 C|17 27.82 cM	End	53,814,708 bp
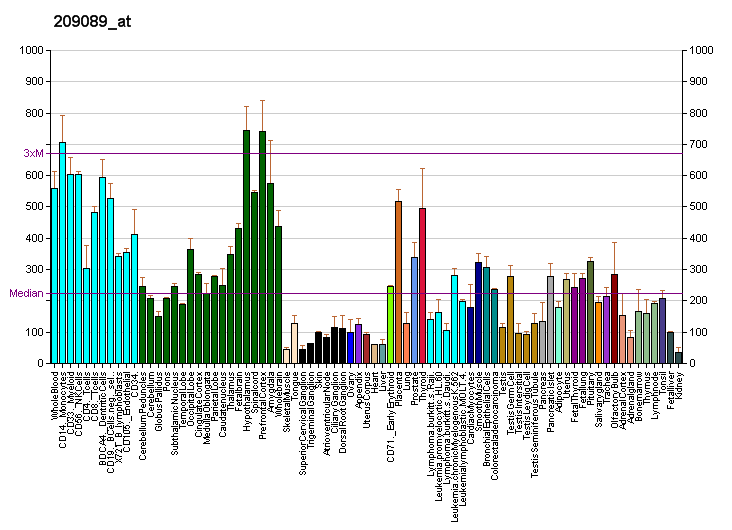

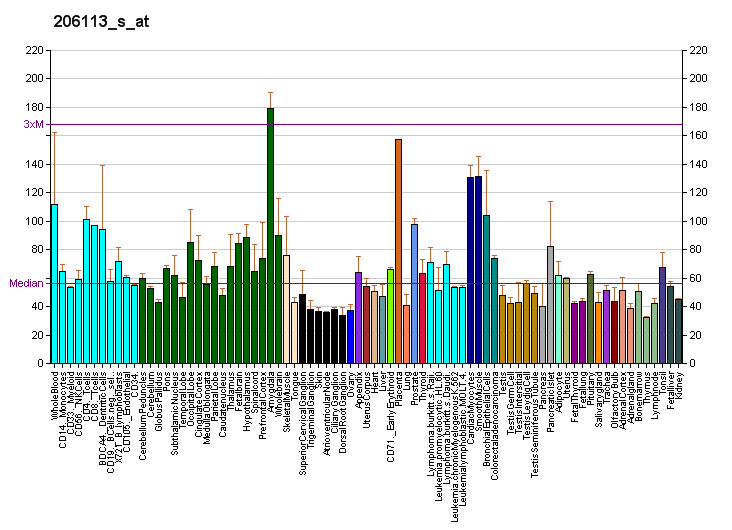
RNA expression pattern
Bgee	Human / Mouse (ortholog); Top expressed in: gingival epithelium; endothelial cell; lower lobe of lung; skin of thigh; corpus epididymis; pons; pars compacta; human penis; pars reticulata; medulla oblongata / Top expressed in: esophagus; ganglionic eminence; hippocampus proper; lens; primary visual cortex; cerebellar cortex; right kidney; zone of skin; superior frontal gyrus; neural tube; More reference expression data
BioGPS	More reference expression data
Gene ontology
Molecular function	nucleotide binding; GDP binding; GTP binding; protein binding; GTPase activity; guanyl nucleotide binding
Cellular component	cytoplasm; axon terminus; endosome; cell projection; membrane; synaptic vesicle; melanosome; ruffle; plasma membrane; endocytic vesicle; axon; soma; terminal bouton; dendrite; somatodendritic compartment; early endosome; phagocytic vesicle; actin cytoskeleton; membrane raft; cytoplasmic side of early endosome membrane; extracellular exosome; cytoplasmic vesicle; phagocytic vesicle membrane; cytosol; endosome membrane; clathrin-coated vesicle membrane; early endosome membrane; early phagosome; postsynaptic early endosome; anchored component of synaptic vesicle membrane
Biological process	regulation of endocytosis; regulation of filopodium assembly; endocytosis; blood coagulation; receptor internalization involved in canonical Wnt signaling pathway; regulation of autophagosome assembly; synaptic vesicle recycling; early endosome to late endosome transport; transport; protein transport; positive regulation of exocytosis; regulation of synaptic vesicle exocytosis; regulation of endosome size; viral RNA genome replication; phagocytosis; phosphatidylinositol biosynthetic process; membrane organization; post-translational protein modification; intracellular protein transport; Rab protein signal transduction; regulation of long-term neuronal synaptic plasticity; amyloid-beta clearance by transcytosis
Sources:Amigo / QuickGO
Orthologs
Databases	NCBI: entry; OMA: entry
Species	Human	Mouse
Entrez	5868	271457
Ensembl	ENSG00000144566	ENSMUSG00000017831
UniProt	P20339	Q9CQD1
RefSeq (mRNA)	NM_004162; NM_001292048	NM_025887
RefSeq (protein)	NP_001278977; NP_004153	NP_080163
Location (UCSC)	Chr 3: 19.95 – 19.99 Mb	Chr 17: 53.79 – 53.81 Mb
PubMed search
- Wikidata
View/Edit Human	View/Edit Mouse

Ras-related protein Rab-5A is a protein that in humans is encoded by the RAB5A gene.

== Function ==
RAB5A localizes to early endosomes where it is involved in the recruitment of RAB7A and the maturation of these compartments to early endosomes. It drives the maturation of endosomes by transporting vacuolar (H+)-ATPases (V-ATPases) from trans-Golgi network to endocytic vesicles.

== Interactions ==
RAB5A has been shown to interact with:

- CHML,
- RABEP1,
- SDCBP, and
- ZFYVE20
