= Microregion of Umarizal =

Coordinates: 5°59′27″S 37°48′50″W

Umarizal
- Microregion
- Country: Brazil
- State: Rio Grande do Norte
- Mesoregion: Oeste Potiguar

Umarizal was a microregion in the Brazilian state of Rio Grande do Norte.

== Municipalities ==
The microregion consisted of the following municipalities:

- Almino Afonso
- Antônio Martins
- Frutuoso Gomes
- João Dias
- Lucrécia
- Martins
- Olho-d'Água do Borges
- Patu
- Rafael Godeiro
- Serrinha dos Pintos
- Umarizal
