= Antônio Martins =

Municipality in Rio Grande do Norte, Brazil

- Municipality
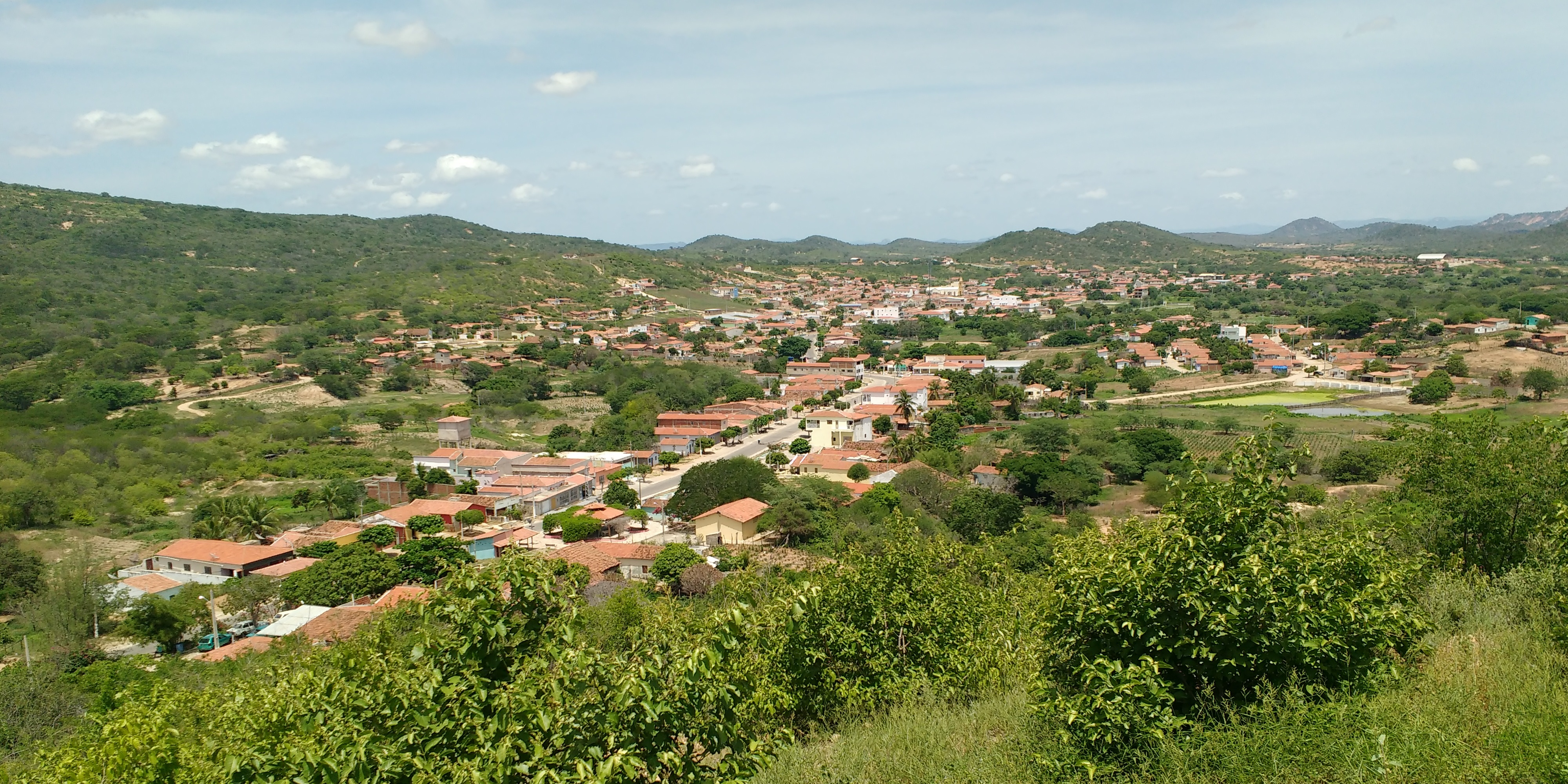

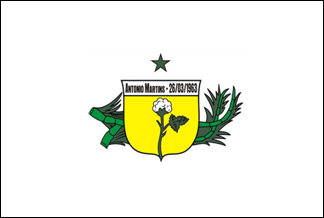
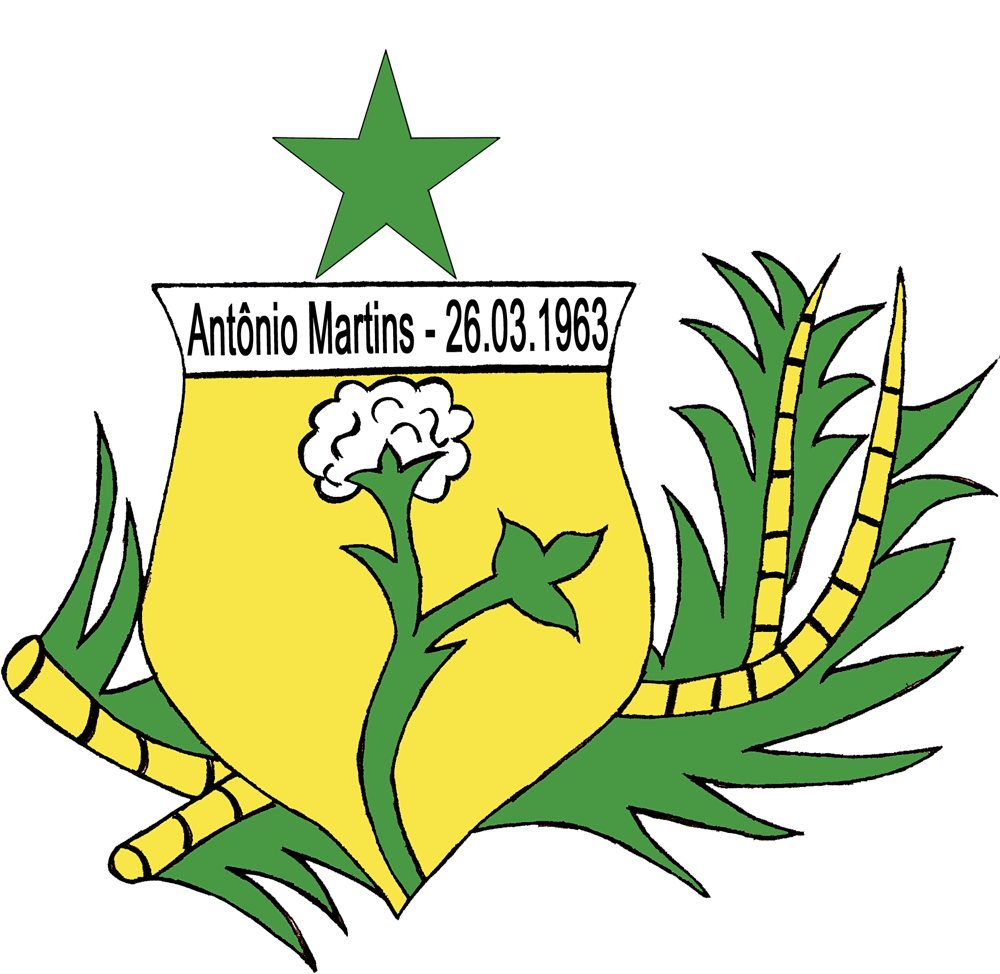
- Flag Coat of arms

- Location in Brazil
- Coordinates: 6°12′S 37°53′W
- Country: Brazil
- Region: Nordeste
- State: Rio Grande do Norte
- Mesoregion: Oeste Potiguar

Population (2022)
  - Total: 6,577
- Time zone: UTC -3

Antônio Martins is a municipality in the state of Rio Grande do Norte in the Northeast region of Brazil. With an area of 244.897 square kilometers (94.555 sq mi), of which 1.9265 square kilometres (0.7438 sq mi) is urban, it is located 300 km from Natal, the state capital, and 1,525 km from Brasília, the federal capital. Its population in the 2022 demographic census was 6,577 inhabitants, according to the Brazilian Institute of Geography and Statistics (IBGE), ranking as the 93rd most populous municipality in the state of Rio Grande do Norte.

== Geography ==
The territory of Antônio Martins covers 244.897 square kilometers (94.555 sq mi), of which 1.9265 square kilometres (0.7438 sq mi) constitutes the urban area. It sits at an average altitude of 312 meters above sea level. Antônio Martins borders these municipalities: to the north, Martins, Frutuoso Gomes, and Serrinha dos Pintos; to the south, Alexandria and João Dias; to the east, Almino Afonso and Catolé do Rocha (Paraíba); and to the west, Marcelino Vieira, Pau dos Ferros, and Pilões. The city is located 300 km from the state capital Natal, and 1,525 km from the federal capital Brasília.

Under the territorial division established in 2017 by the Brazilian Institute of Geography and Statistics (IBGE), the municipality belongs to the immediate geographical region of Pau dos Ferros, within the intermediate region of Mossoró. Previously, under the microregion and mesoregion divisions, it was part of the microregion of Umarizal in the mesoregion of Oeste Potiguar.

== Demographics ==
In the 2022 census, the municipality had a population of 6,577 inhabitants and ranked only 93rd in the state that year (out of 167 municipalities), with 50.43% female and 49.57% male, resulting in a sex ratio of 98.28 (9,828 men for every 10,000 women), compared to 6,907 inhabitants in the 2010 census (54.79% living in the urban area), when it held the 92nd state position. Between the 2010 and 2022 censuses, the population of Antônio Martins changed at an annual geometric growth rate of -0.41%. Regarding age group in the 2022 census, 68.6% of the inhabitants were between 15 and 64 years old, 17.46% were under fifteen, and 13.93% were 65 or older. The population density in 2022 was 26.86 inhabitants per square kilometer, with an average of 2.77 inhabitants per household.

The municipality's Human Development Index (HDI-M) is considered medium, according to data from the United Nations Development Programme. According to the 2010 report published in 2013, its value was 0.578, ranking 16th in the state and 2,870th nationally (out of 5,565 municipalities), and the Gini coefficient rose from 0.39 in 2003 to 0.51 in 2010. Considering only the longevity index, its value is 0.554, the income index is 0.606, and the education index is 0.458.

== See also ==
- List of municipalities in Rio Grande do Norte
