= Silvana Santos =

Brazilian biologist (born 1959)

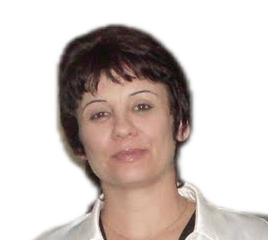
- Santos in 2010
- Born: Silvana Cristina dos Santos; 14 December 1959 (age 66); Sao Paulo, Brazil
- Education: BA, MSc and Ph.D. at USP
- Alma mater: University of Sao Paulo
- Occupation: Professor
- Known for: Santos Syndrome, SPOAN Syndrome, MRT-59
- Awards: 100 Women (BBC)
- Scientific career
- Fields: Medical Genetics, Community Genetics, Education
- Workplaces: State University of Paraiba

Silvana Santos (born December 14, 1959, Sao Paulo, Brazil), is a Brazilian geneticist and biologist known for her research into rare developmental disorders related to inbreeding. She led the research group that discovered SPOAN syndrome in Serrinha dos Pintos, a municipality with a highly inbred population in the state of Rio Grande do Norte in the Northeast region of Brazil.

She has also discovered another novel developmental syndrome involving the development of the limbs, first observed in the municipality of Riacho de Santana, also in Rio Grande do Norte. The syndrome received her surname Santos and it is caused by a mutation in WNT7A gene.

She has worked as a professor at the State University of Paraíba since 2008.

In 2024, she was recognised by the BBC in their annual list of 100 inspiring and influential women.
