= João Dias =

João Dias may refer to:

- Fajã de João Dias, permanent debris field on the island of São Jorge, Azores
- João Dias, Rio Grande do Norte, municipality in the state of Rio Grande do Norte in Brazil
- João Dias (CPTM), train station in São Paulo, Brazil
- João Dias (footballer) (born 1986), Portuguese footballer
- João Dias (politician) (born 1973), Portuguese politician
- João Scognamiglio Clá Dias (born 1939), Brazilian Roman Catholic priest
