= KLC1 =

Gene of the kinesin light chain family

Identifiers
- Aliases: KLC1, KLC, KNS2, KNS2A, kinesin light chain 1
- External IDs: OMIM: 600025; MGI: 107978; GeneCards: KLC1
Available structures
PDB	Ortholog search: PDBe RCSB
PDB	List of PDB id codes 3NF1

Gene location (Human)
Chr.	Chromosome 14 (human)
Band	14q32.33	Start	103,561,896 bp
Band	14q32.33	End	103,714,249 bp

Gene location (Mouse)
Chr.	Chromosome 12 (mouse)
Band	12 F1|12 61.13 cM	Start	111,725,283 bp
Band	12 F1|12 61.13 cM	End	111,774,278 bp
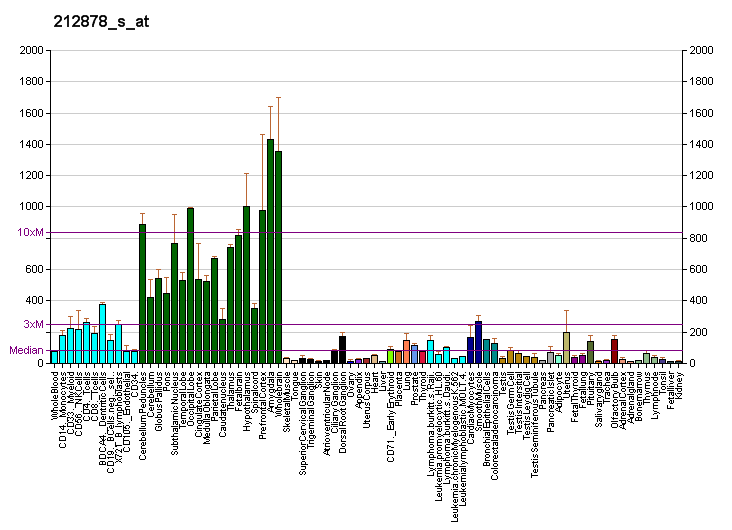

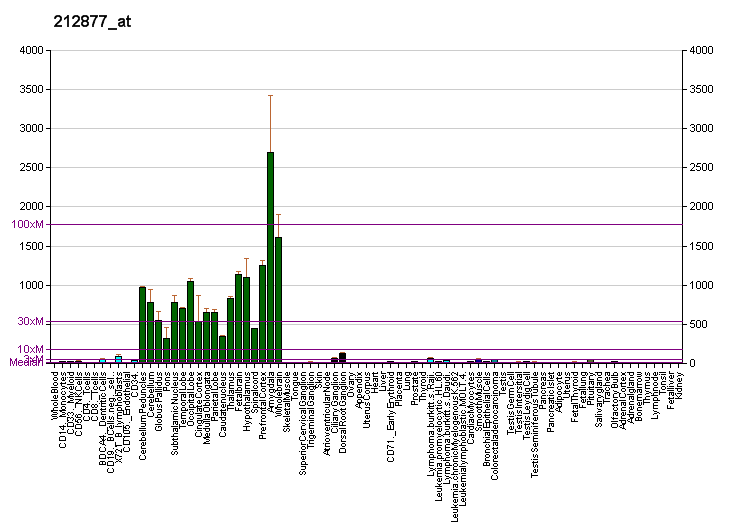
RNA expression pattern
Bgee	Human / Mouse (ortholog); Top expressed in: right hemisphere of cerebellum; right frontal lobe; C1 segment; Brodmann area 9; ganglionic eminence; tibial nerve; anterior pituitary; prefrontal cortex; olfactory bulb; sural nerve / Top expressed in: facial motor nucleus; pontine nuclei; dorsal tegmental nucleus; medial vestibular nucleus; medial dorsal nucleus; habenula; anterior horn of spinal cord; ventral tegmental area; cerebellar vermis; subiculum; More reference expression data
BioGPS	More reference expression data
Gene ontology
Molecular function	cytoskeletal motor activity; microtubule motor activity; protein binding
Cellular component	cell projection; growth cone; cytoplasmic vesicle; cytoplasm; microtubule; cytoskeleton; cytosol; kinesin complex; membrane
Biological process	microtubule-based movement; antigen processing and presentation of exogenous peptide antigen via MHC class II; viral process; stress granule disassembly; retrograde vesicle-mediated transport, Golgi to endoplasmic reticulum
Sources:Amigo / QuickGO
Orthologs
Databases	NCBI: entry; OMA: entry
Species	Human	Mouse
Entrez	3831	16593
Ensembl	ENSG00000126214	ENSMUSG00000021288
UniProt	Q07866	O88447
RefSeq (mRNA)	NM_182923; NM_001130107; NM_005552	NM_001025358; NM_001025359; NM_001025360; NM_001025361; NM_001025362 NM_001025363; NM_001081959; NM_008450; NM_001361605; NM_001361609; NM_001361610; NM_001361611; NM_001361612; NM_001361613; NM_001361614
RefSeq (protein)	NP_001123579; NP_005543; NP_891553	n/a
Location (UCSC)	Chr 14: 103.56 – 103.71 Mb	Chr 12: 111.73 – 111.77 Mb
PubMed search
- Wikidata
View/Edit Human	View/Edit Mouse

Kinesin light chain 1 is a protein that in humans is encoded by the KLC1 gene.

Conventional kinesin is a tetrameric molecule composed of two heavy chains and two light chains, and transports various cargos along microtubules toward their plus ends. The heavy chains provide the motor activity, while the light chains bind to various cargos. This gene encodes a member of the kinesin light chain family. It associates with kinesin heavy chain through an N-terminal domain, and six tetratricopeptide repeat (TPR) motifs are thought to be involved in binding of cargos such as vesicles, mitochondria, and the Golgi complex. Thus, kinesin light chains function as adapter molecules and not motors per se. Although previously named "kinesin 2", this gene is not a member of the kinesin-2 / kinesin heavy chain subfamily of kinesin motor proteins. Extensive alternative splicing produces isoforms with different C-termini that are proposed to bind to different cargos; however, the full-length nature of some of these variants has not been determined.

== Interactions ==
KLC1 has been shown to interact with MAPK8IP3, KIF5B and KIF5A.
