= KIF5A =

Protein-coding gene in humans

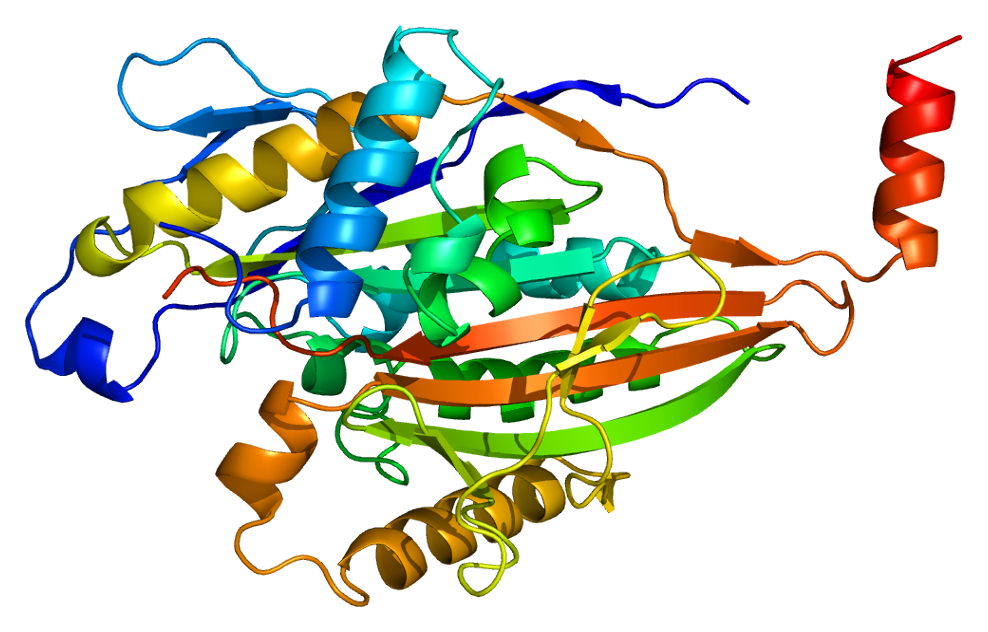

Identifiers
- Aliases: KIF5A, D12S1889, MY050, NKHC, SPG10, kinesin family member 5A, NEIMY, ALS25
- External IDs: OMIM: 602821; MGI: 109564; GeneCards: KIF5A
Available structures
PDB	Ortholog search: PDBe RCSB
PDB	List of PDB id codes 4UXT, 4UXY, 4UY0
Enzyme activity
EC #	BRENDA	ExPASy	KEGG	MetaCyc
5.6.1.3	↗	↗	↗	↗

Gene location (Human)
Chr.	Chromosome 12 (human)
Band	12q13.3	Start	57,546,026 bp
Band	12q13.3	End	57,586,633 bp

Gene location (Mouse)
Chr.	Chromosome 10 (mouse)
Band	10 D3|10 74.5 cM	Start	127,061,565 bp
Band	10 D3|10 74.5 cM	End	127,099,217 bp
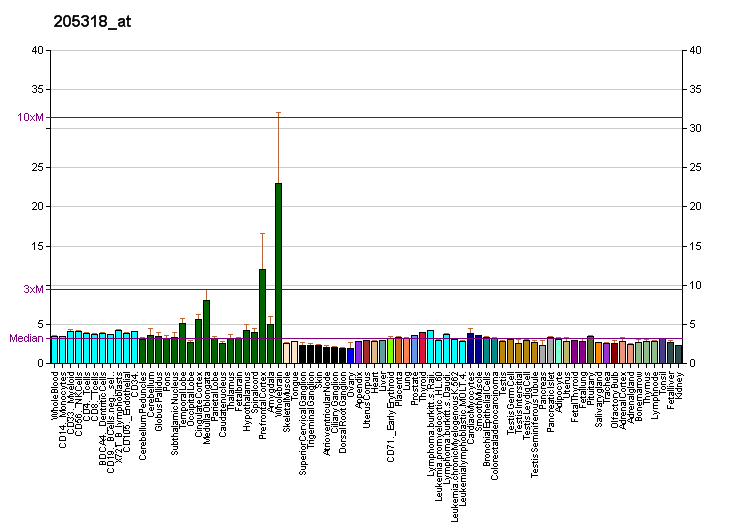
RNA expression pattern
Bgee	Human / Mouse (ortholog); Top expressed in: right frontal lobe; right hemisphere of cerebellum; Brodmann area 9; cingulate gyrus; anterior cingulate cortex; prefrontal cortex; ganglionic eminence; C1 segment; amygdala; nucleus accumbens / Top expressed in: globus pallidus; lateral geniculate nucleus; superior frontal gyrus; subiculum; lateral hypothalamus; pontine nuclei; anterior amygdaloid area; ventral tegmental area; medial geniculate nucleus; nucleus accumbens; More reference expression data
BioGPS	More reference expression data
Gene ontology
Molecular function	nucleotide binding; microtubule motor activity; microtubule binding; protein binding; cytoskeletal motor activity; plus-end-directed microtubule motor activity; ATP binding; kinesin binding; ATPase activity
Cellular component	cytoplasm; cytosol; membrane; kinesin complex; soma; ciliary rootlet; perinuclear region of cytoplasm; neuron projection; microtubule; cytoskeleton; dendrite cytoplasm; synapse; axon cytoplasm
Biological process	protein localization; cytoskeleton-dependent intracellular transport; antigen processing and presentation of exogenous peptide antigen via MHC class II; axon guidance; chemical synaptic transmission; retrograde vesicle-mediated transport, Golgi to endoplasmic reticulum; vesicle-mediated transport; microtubule-based movement; anterograde dendritic transport of neurotransmitter receptor complex; synaptic vesicle transport; anterograde axonal protein transport; retrograde neuronal dense core vesicle transport
Sources:Amigo / QuickGO
Orthologs
Databases	NCBI: entry; OMA: entry
Species	Human	Mouse
Entrez	3798	16572
Ensembl	ENSG00000155980	ENSMUSG00000074657
UniProt	Q12840	P33175
RefSeq (mRNA)	NM_004984; NM_001354705; NM_032624	NM_001039000; NM_008447
RefSeq (protein)	NP_004975; NP_001341634	NP_001034089; NP_032473
Location (UCSC)	Chr 12: 57.55 – 57.59 Mb	Chr 10: 127.06 – 127.1 Mb
PubMed search
- Wikidata
View/Edit Human	View/Edit Mouse

Kinesin family member 5A is a protein that in humans is encoded by the KIF5A gene. It is part of the kinesin family of motor proteins.

This gene encodes a member of the kinesin family of proteins. Members of this family are part of a multi-subunit complex that functions as a microtubule motor in intracellular organelle transport. Mutations in this gene cause autosomal dominant spastic paraplegia 10.

== Interactions ==
KIF5A has been shown to interact with KLC1.

== Clinical significance ==
Mutations in KIF5A have been reported to cause hereditary spastic paraplegia type 10 (SPG1).

Mutations in KIF5A have also been found to cause amyotrophic lateral sclerosis.

KIF5A has been shown to play a role in Alzheimer's disease by modulating the toxic effect of beta-amyloid on axonal transport of mitochondria.
