= WNT7A =

Protein-coding gene in the species Homo sapiens

Identifiers
- Aliases: WNT7A, Wnt family member 7A, Wnt-7a
- External IDs: OMIM: 601570; MGI: 98961; GeneCards: WNT7A
Available structures
PDB	Ortholog search: PDBe RCSB
PDB	List of PDB id codes 4UZQ

Gene location (Human)
Chr.	Chromosome 3 (human)
Band	3p25.1	Start	13,816,258 bp
Band	3p25.1	End	13,880,071 bp

Gene location (Mouse)
Chr.	Chromosome 6 (mouse)
Band	6 D1|6 40.45 cM	Start	91,340,963 bp
Band	6 D1|6 40.45 cM	End	91,388,345 bp
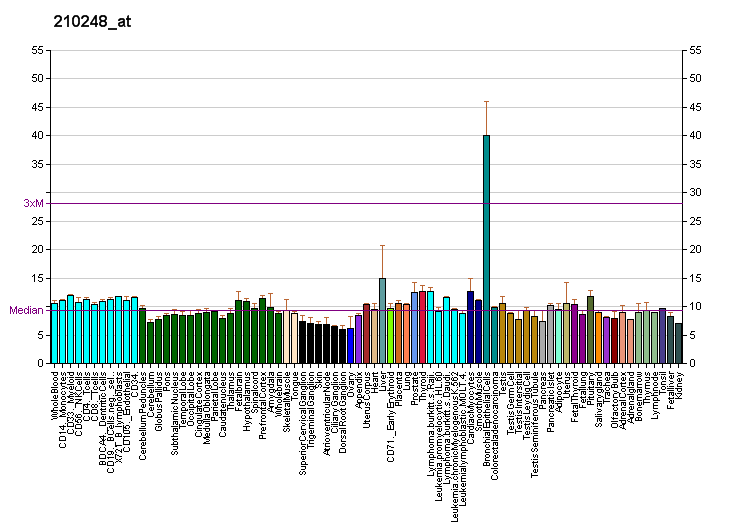
RNA expression pattern
Bgee	Human / Mouse (ortholog); Top expressed in: ventricular zone; ganglionic eminence; prefrontal cortex; gonad; right frontal lobe; cingulate gyrus; anterior cingulate cortex; amygdala; right lung; Brodmann area 9 / Top expressed in: surface ectoderm; set of lens fibers; corneal epithelium; epithelium of lens; paramesonephric duct; corneal endothelium; epithelium of vagina; medial ganglionic eminence; ventricular zone; Rostral migratory stream; More reference expression data
BioGPS	More reference expression data
Gene ontology
Molecular function	receptor ligand activity; cytokine activity; frizzled binding; protein binding; signaling receptor binding
Cellular component	endocytic vesicle membrane; endoplasmic reticulum lumen; plasma membrane; extracellular fluid; extracellular region; cell surface; Golgi lumen; extracellular exosome; presynapse; synapse
Biological process	positive regulation of synapse assembly; cellular response to transforming growth factor beta stimulus; excitatory synapse assembly; roof of mouth development; non-canonical Wnt signaling pathway; cell fate commitment; response to estradiol; positive regulation of epithelial cell proliferation involved in wound healing; chondrocyte differentiation; axonogenesis; somatic stem cell population maintenance; uterus morphogenesis; stem cell development; positive regulation of canonical Wnt signaling pathway; negative regulation of neurogenesis; synapse organization; somatic stem cell division; embryonic digit morphogenesis; positive regulation of protein localization to synapse; embryonic axis specification; sex differentiation; negative regulation of apoptotic process; positive regulation of JNK cascade; wound healing; Wnt signaling pathway involved in wound healing, spreading of epidermal cells; response to estrogen; limb development; positive regulation of endothelial cell migration; positive regulation of transcription, DNA-templated; multicellular organism development; regulation of axonogenesis; dendritic spine morphogenesis; synaptic vesicle recycling; uterus development; regulation of axon diameter; skeletal muscle satellite cell activation; positive regulation of gene expression; cartilage development; regulation of cell population proliferation; embryonic limb morphogenesis; skeletal muscle satellite cell maintenance involved in skeletal muscle regeneration; angiogenesis; oviduct development; establishment of cell polarity; central nervous system vasculogenesis; positive regulation of excitatory postsynaptic potential; positive regulation of cell population proliferation; canonical Wnt signaling pathway; synapse assembly; positive regulation of excitatory synapse assembly; dorsal/ventral pattern formation; cell proliferation in forebrain; embryonic forelimb morphogenesis; neurotransmitter secretion; cartilage condensation; lens fiber cell development; cerebellar granule cell differentiation; positive regulation of transcription by RNA polymerase II; embryonic hindlimb morphogenesis; Wnt signaling pathway
Sources:Amigo / QuickGO
Orthologs
Databases	NCBI: entry; OMA: entry
Species	Human	Mouse
Entrez	7476	22421
Ensembl	ENSG00000154764	ENSMUSG00000030093
UniProt	O00755	P24383
RefSeq (mRNA)	NM_004625	NM_009527; NM_001363757
RefSeq (protein)	NP_004616	NP_033553; NP_001350686
Location (UCSC)	Chr 3: 13.82 – 13.88 Mb	Chr 6: 91.34 – 91.39 Mb
PubMed search
- Wikidata
View/Edit Human	View/Edit Mouse

Protein Wnt-7a is a protein that in humans is encoded by the WNT7A gene.

== Function ==
The WNT gene family consists of structurally related genes that encode secreted signaling proteins. These proteins have been implicated in oncogenesis and in several developmental processes, including regulation of cell fate and patterning during embryogenesis. This gene is a member of the WNT gene family. It encodes a protein showing 99% amino acid identity to the mouse Wnt7A protein. This gene not only guides the development of the anterior-posterior axis in the female reproductive tract but also plays a critical role in uterine smooth muscle pattering and maintenance of adult uterine function. It is also responsive to changes in the levels of sex steroid hormone in the female reproductive tract. Decreased expression of this gene in human uterine leiomyoma is found to be inversely associated with the expression of estrogen receptor alpha.

== Santos syndrome ==
Santos syndrome is characterized by short stature, fibular agenesis or hypoplasia, clubfeet with oligodactyly, acromial dimples, limited forearm/hand range of motion, and severe nail hypoplasia or anonychia. It is caused by a homozygous mutation in the WNT7A gene, leading to a phenotype similar to Fuhrmann syndrome but with preaxial polydactyly and less severe limb defects. The inheritance pattern is autosomal dominant with incomplete penetrance. This mutation has a recent origin (73 years) and is located inside a Native-american homozygous haplotype. It was discovered by Silvana Santos, a Brazilian researcher who won the 100 Woman BBC prize in 2024.

== Knockout and functional evidence ==
The signaling molecule Wnt7-a is expressed within the female embryo, controlling the proper establishment of the uterus and the anterior-posterior axis within the female reproductive tract. Prenatal knockout of the Wnt7-a gene disrupts the early stages of the female reproductive tract, resulting in the lack of a comprehensive analysis of the gene’s role in development. However, a conditional knockout of the gene after birth, provided greater insight into the role of the gene in terms of uterine development. Initial appearance between the control mice and mutant mice appear similar, as both models presented with a vagina, cervix, oviduct, and ovary. In postnatal development, the Wnt7-a-null mice failed to develop endometrial glands and lacked the expression of genes Foxa2, Hoxa10, Hoxa11, Msx1, and Wnt16. The lack of endometrial glands within the mice resulted in infertility, as blastocyst failed to implant in the immature uterus. Loss of Wnt7-a during prenatal development results in absence of normal female anatomy and infertility while loss of Wnt7-a during postnatal development results in the presence of normal female anatomy and infertility.
