= KLC2 =

Protein-coding gene in the species Homo sapiens

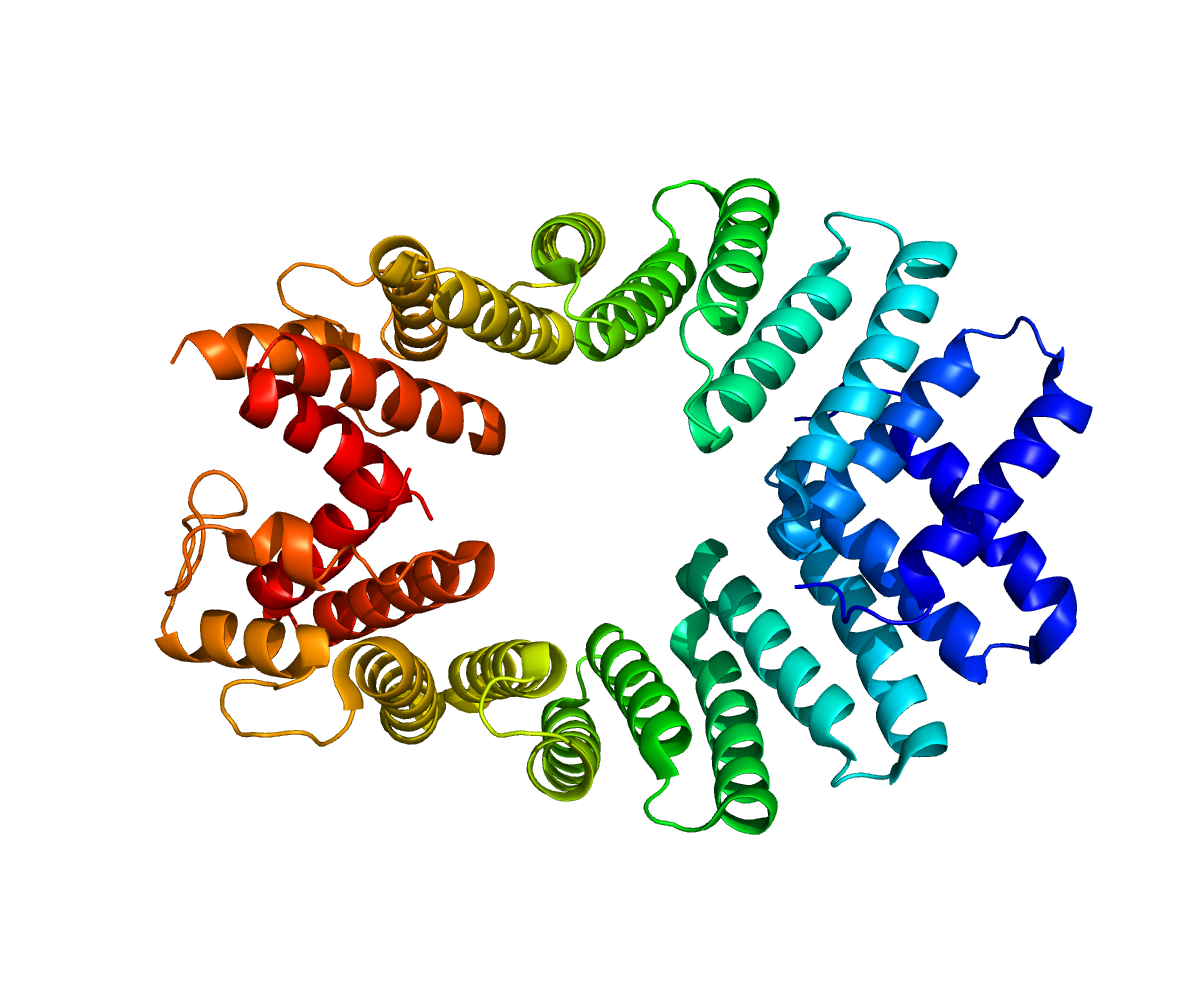

Identifiers
- Aliases: KLC2, kinesin light chain 2
- External IDs: OMIM: 611729; MGI: 107953; GeneCards: KLC2
Available structures
PDB	Ortholog search: PDBe RCSB
PDB	List of PDB id codes 3CEQ, 3EDT

Gene location (Human)
Chr.	Chromosome 11 (human)
Band	11q13.2	Start	66,257,294 bp
Band	11q13.2	End	66,267,860 bp

Gene location (Mouse)
Chr.	Chromosome 19 (mouse)
Band	19 A|19 4.25 cM	Start	5,157,774 bp
Band	19 A|19 4.25 cM	End	5,168,588 bp
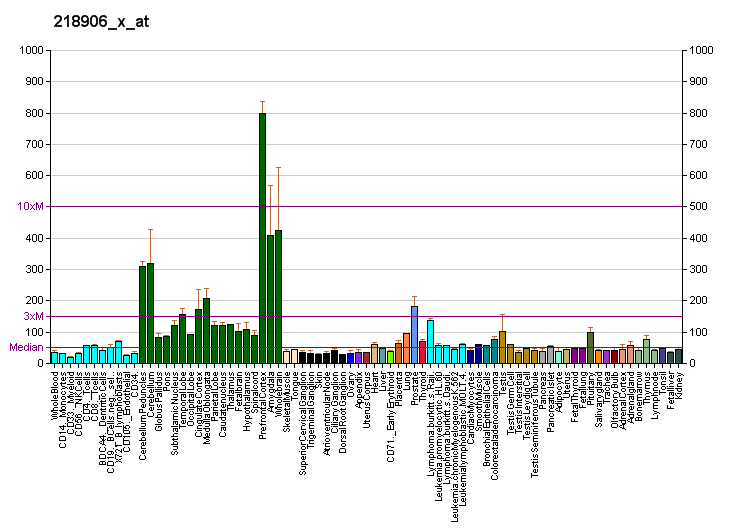
RNA expression pattern
Bgee	Human / Mouse (ortholog); Top expressed in: right hemisphere of cerebellum; right frontal lobe; prefrontal cortex; Brodmann area 9; anterior cingulate cortex; right testis; endothelial cell; left testis; anterior pituitary; primary visual cortex / Top expressed in: superior frontal gyrus; primary visual cortex; cerebellar cortex; dentate gyrus of hippocampal formation granule cell; neural layer of retina; pontine nuclei; superior colliculus; inferior colliculi; muscle of thigh; medulla oblongata; More reference expression data
BioGPS	More reference expression data
Gene ontology
Molecular function	microtubule motor activity; protein binding; kinesin binding; cadherin binding
Cellular component	cytoplasm; cytosol; microtubule; cytoskeleton; membrane; kinesin I complex; kinesin complex; nucleoplasm; mitochondrion; plasma membrane; protein-containing complex
Biological process	microtubule-based movement; antigen processing and presentation of exogenous peptide antigen via MHC class II; retrograde vesicle-mediated transport, Golgi to endoplasmic reticulum
Sources:Amigo / QuickGO
Orthologs
Databases	NCBI: entry; OMA: entry
Species	Human	Mouse
Entrez	64837	16594
Ensembl	ENSG00000174996	ENSMUSG00000024862
UniProt	Q9H0B6	O88448
RefSeq (mRNA)	NM_001134774; NM_001134775; NM_001134776; NM_022822; NM_001318734	NM_008451; NM_001369360; NM_001369361; NM_001369362
RefSeq (protein)	NP_001128246; NP_001128247; NP_001128248; NP_001305663; NP_073733	n/a
Location (UCSC)	Chr 11: 66.26 – 66.27 Mb	Chr 19: 5.16 – 5.17 Mb
PubMed search
- Wikidata
View/Edit Human	View/Edit Mouse

Kinesin light chain 2 is a protein that in humans is encoded by the KLC2 gene. This gene is responsible for SPOAN syndrome, a type of hereditary spastic paraplegia.

== Interactions ==
KLC2 has been shown to interact with MAPK8IP3 and KIF5B.

== SPOAN syndrome ==
SPOAN syndrome was first discovered by a research group led by Silvana Santos in the Serrinha dos Pintos area of Northeast Brazil known for high levels of inbreeding. The name derives from an acronym for spastic paraplegia, optic atrophy, and peripheral neuropathy (SPOAN), the symptoms characteristic to the syndrome. The cause is a homozygous deletion of 216 base pairs in KLC2 regulatory region. This homozygous deletion has been found in more than 70 individuals from Rio Grande do Norte backlands and siblings in Egypt; the mutation origin was in Iberian Peninsula over 485 years ago.
