= KIF5B =

Protein-coding gene in the species Homo sapiens

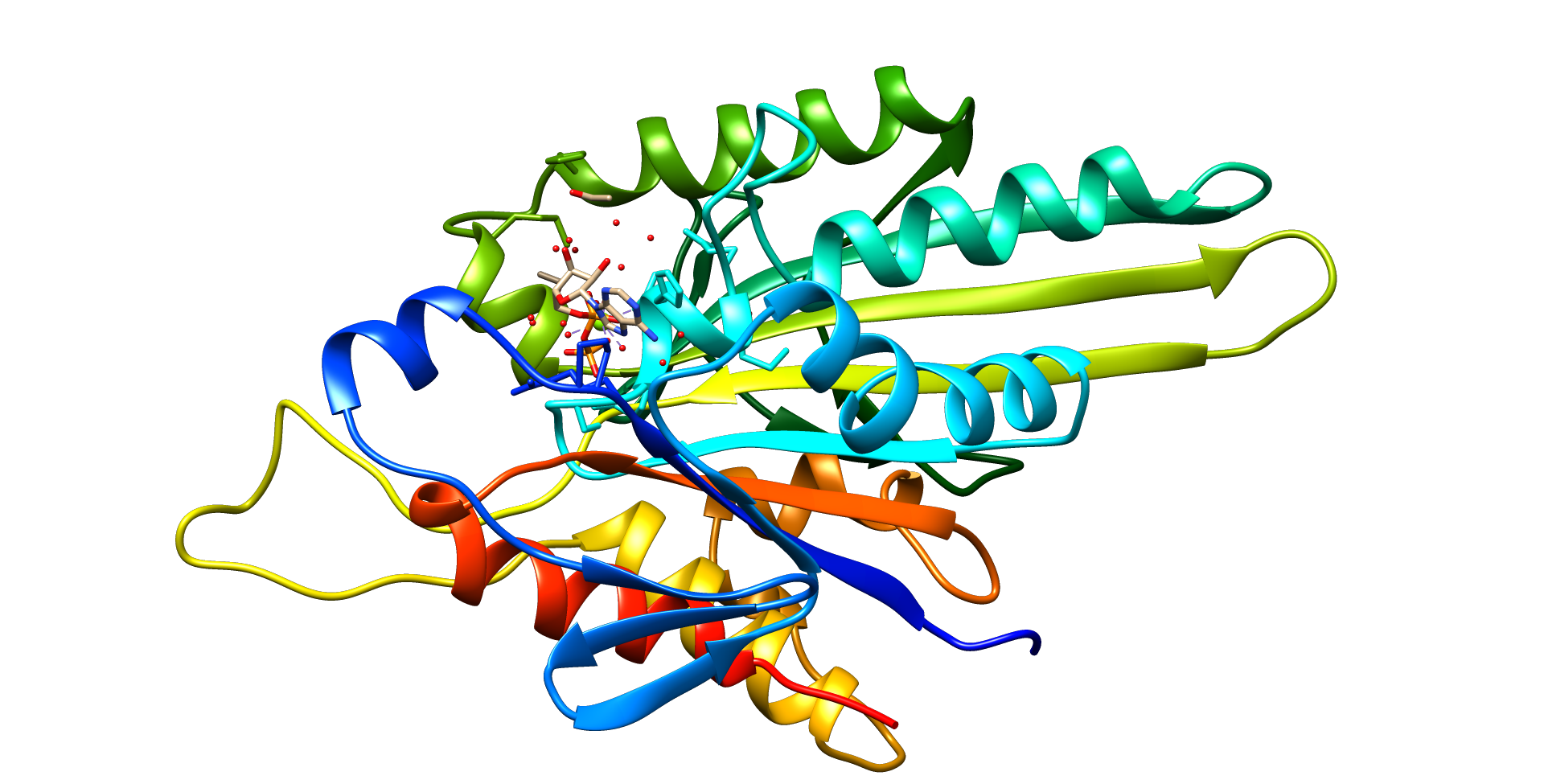

Identifiers
- Aliases: KIF5B, HEL-S-61, KINH, KNS, KNS1, UKHC, kinesin family member 5B
- External IDs: OMIM: 602809; MGI: 1098268; GeneCards: KIF5B
Available structures
PDB	Ortholog search: PDBe RCSB
PDB	List of PDB id codes 1BG2, 1MKJ, 2P4N, 3J8X, 3J8Y, 4HNA, 4LNU

Gene location (Human)
Chr.	Chromosome 10 (human)
Band	10p11.22	Start	32,009,015 bp
Band	10p11.22	End	32,056,425 bp

Gene location (Mouse)
Chr.	Chromosome 18 (mouse)
Band	18 A1|18 4.46 cM	Start	6,201,002 bp
Band	18 A1|18 4.46 cM	End	6,242,174 bp
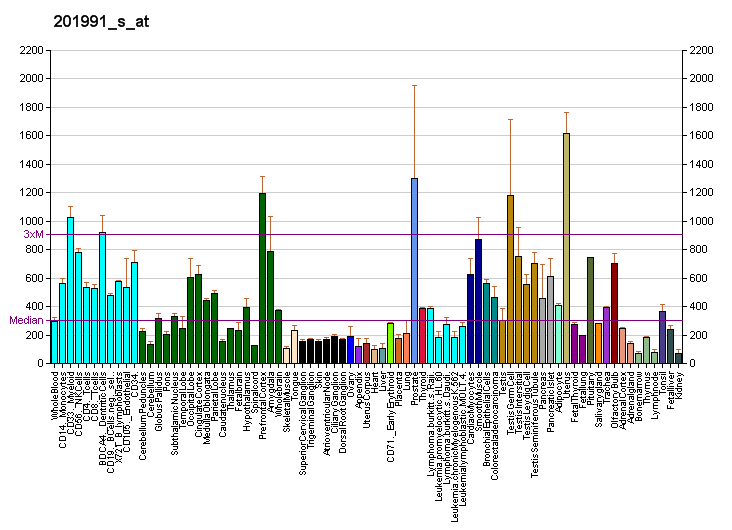

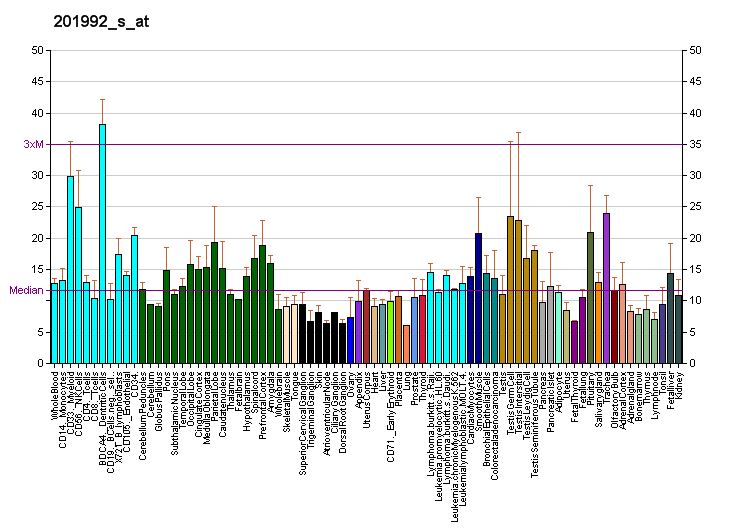
RNA expression pattern
Bgee	Human / Mouse (ortholog); Top expressed in: tail of epididymis; caput epididymis; optic nerve; corpus epididymis; mucosa of paranasal sinus; inferior ganglion of vagus nerve; visceral pleura; lower lobe of lung; internal globus pallidus; Skeletal muscle tissue of biceps brachii / Top expressed in: globus pallidus; lateral geniculate nucleus; atrioventricular valve; ventral tegmental area; pontine nuclei; epithelium of lens; lateral hypothalamus; deep cerebellar nuclei; seminal vesicula; epithelium of stomach; More reference expression data
BioGPS	More reference expression data
Gene ontology
Molecular function	microtubule motor activity; nucleotide binding; microtubule binding; protein binding; plus-end-directed microtubule motor activity; ATP binding; JUN kinase binding; cadherin binding; microtubule lateral binding; identical protein binding; ATPase activity
Cellular component	vesicle; membrane; kinesin complex; endocytic vesicle; microtubule organizing center; membrane-bounded organelle; ciliary rootlet; perinuclear region of cytoplasm; neuron projection; microtubule; cytoskeleton; axonal growth cone; cytoplasm; cytosol; microtubule cytoskeleton; phagocytic vesicle; axon cytoplasm
Biological process	cytoskeleton-dependent intracellular transport; plus-end-directed vesicle transport along microtubule; cytoplasm organization; vesicle transport along microtubule; positive regulation of potassium ion transport; regulation of membrane potential; positive regulation of synaptic transmission, GABAergic; axon guidance; microtubule-based movement; stress granule disassembly; positive regulation of insulin secretion involved in cellular response to glucose stimulus; positive regulation of intracellular protein transport; positive regulation of voltage-gated sodium channel activity; positive regulation of vesicle fusion; centrosome localization; brain development; hippocampus development; positive regulation of protein localization to plasma membrane; cellular response to interferon-gamma; anterograde axonal protein transport; anterograde neuronal dense core vesicle transport; retrograde neuronal dense core vesicle transport
Sources:Amigo / QuickGO
Orthologs
Databases	NCBI: entry; OMA: entry
Species	Human	Mouse
Entrez	3799	16573
Ensembl	ENSG00000170759	ENSMUSG00000006740
UniProt	P33176	Q61768
RefSeq (mRNA)	NM_004521	NM_008448
RefSeq (protein)	NP_004512	NP_032474
Location (UCSC)	Chr 10: 32.01 – 32.06 Mb	Chr 18: 6.2 – 6.24 Mb
PubMed search
- Wikidata
View/Edit Human	View/Edit Mouse

Kinesin family member 5B (KIF5B) is a protein that in humans is encoded by the KIF5B gene. It is part of the kinesin family of motor proteins.

== Interactions ==
KIF5B has been shown to interact with:

- KLC1,
- KLC2,
- SNAP-25,
- SNAP23, and
- YWHAH.
