= Almino Afonso =

Municipality in Rio Grande do Norte, Brazil

- Municipality
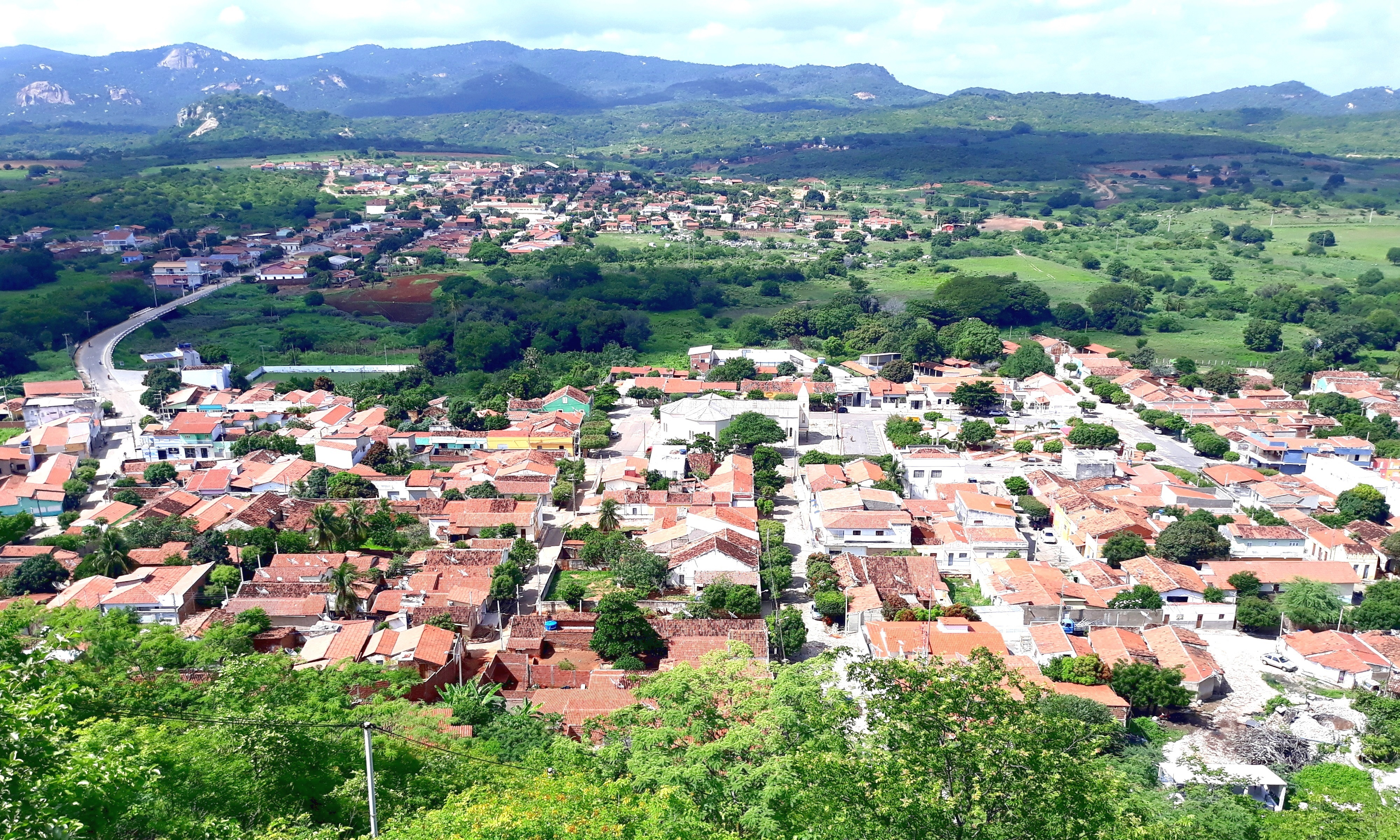

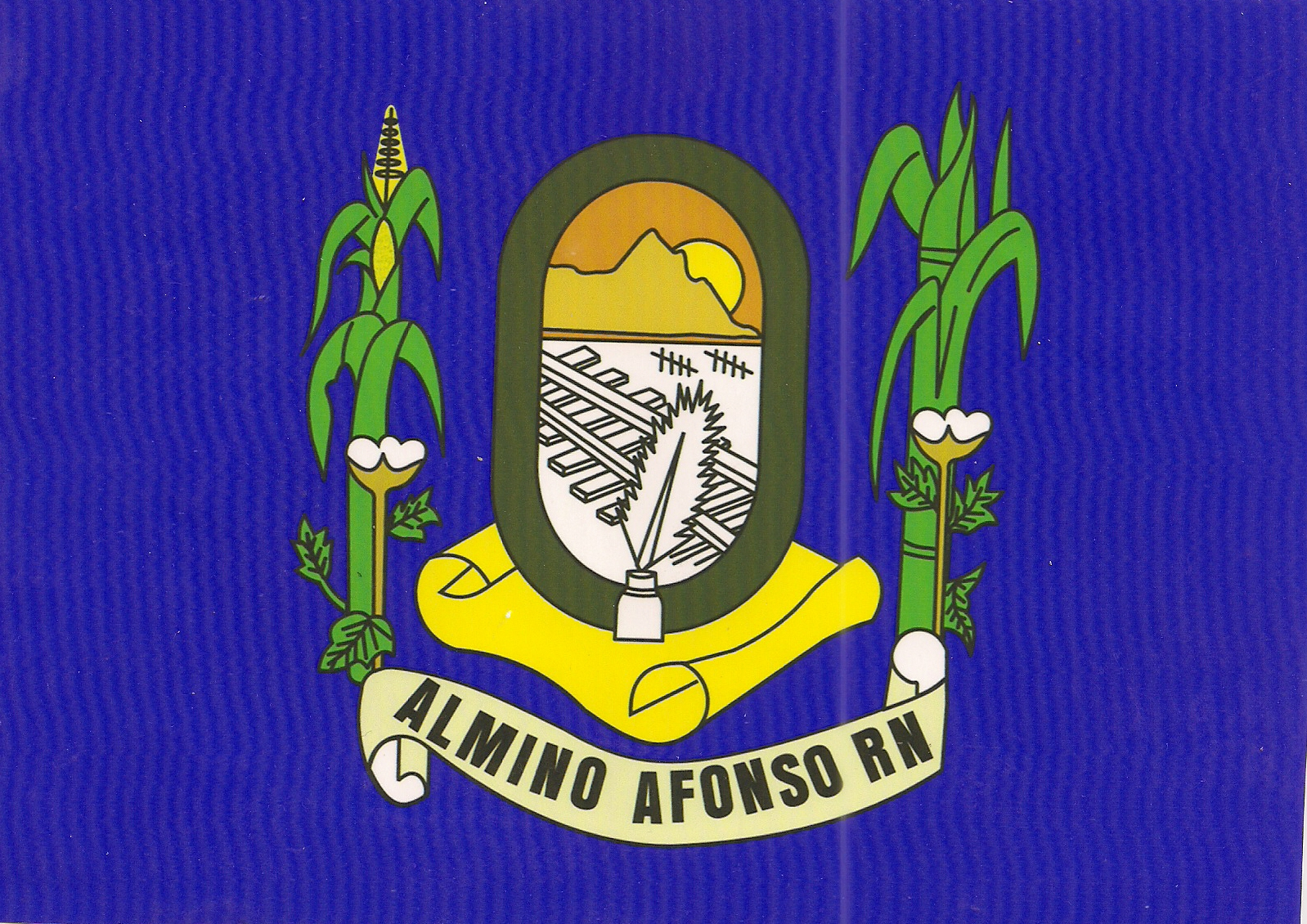
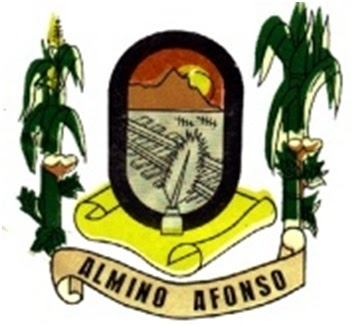
- Flag Coat of arms

- Location in Rio Grande do Norte

- Location in Brazil
- Coordinates: 6°09′S 37°46′W
- Country: Brazil
- Region: Nordeste
- State: Rio Grande do Norte
- Mesoregion: Oeste Potiguar

Population (2022)
  - Total: 4,687
- Time zone: UTC -3

Almino Afonso is a municipality in the state of Rio Grande do Norte in the Northeast region of Brazil. With an area of 128.038 square kilometers (49.436 sq mi), of which 1.0558 square kilometres (0.4076 sq mi) is urban, it is located 286 km from Natal, the state capital, and 1,541 km from Brasília, the federal capital. Its population in the 2022 demographic census was 4,687 inhabitants, according to the Brazilian Institute of Geography and Statistics (IBGE), ranking as the 122nd most populous municipality in the state of Rio Grande do Norte.

== Geography ==
The territory of Almino Afonso covers 128.038 square kilometers (49.436 sq mi), of which 1.0558 square kilometres (0.4076 sq mi) constitutes the urban area. It sits at an average altitude of 236 meters above sea level. The city is located 286 km from the state capital Natal, and 1,541 km from the federal capital Brasília.

Under the territorial division established in 2017 by the Brazilian Institute of Geography and Statistics (IBGE), the municipality belongs to the immediate geographical region of Pau dos Ferros, within the intermediate region of Mossoró. Previously, under the microregion and mesoregion divisions, it was part of the microregion of Umarizal in the mesoregion of Oeste Potiguar.

== Demographics ==
In the 2022 census, the municipality had a population of 4,687 inhabitants and ranked only 122nd in the state that year (out of 167 municipalities), with 50.22% female and 49.78% male, resulting in a sex ratio of 99.11 (9,911 men for every 10,000 women), compared to 4.871 inhabitants in the 2010 census (71.42% living in the urban area), when it held the 117th state position. Between the 2010 and 2022 censuses, the population of Almino Afonso changed at an annual geometric growth rate of -0.32%. Regarding age group in the 2022 census, 69.3% of the inhabitants were between 15 and 64 years old, 17.69% were under fifteen, and 13.02% were 65 or older. The population density in 2022 was 36.61 inhabitants per square kilometer, with an average of 2.82 inhabitants per household.

The municipality's Human Development Index (HDI-M) is considered medium, according to data from the United Nations Development Programme. According to the 2010 report published in 2013, its value was 0.624, ranking 50th in the state and 3,607th nationally (out of 5,565 municipalities), and the Gini coefficient rose from 0.39 in 2003 to 0.49 in 2010. Considering only the longevity index, its value is 0.739, the income index is 0.578, and the education index is 0.568.

== See also ==
- List of municipalities in Rio Grande do Norte
