= Martins, Rio Grande do Norte =

Municipality in Rio Grande do Norte, Brazil

Coordinates: 6°05′16″S 37°54′39″W

- Municipality
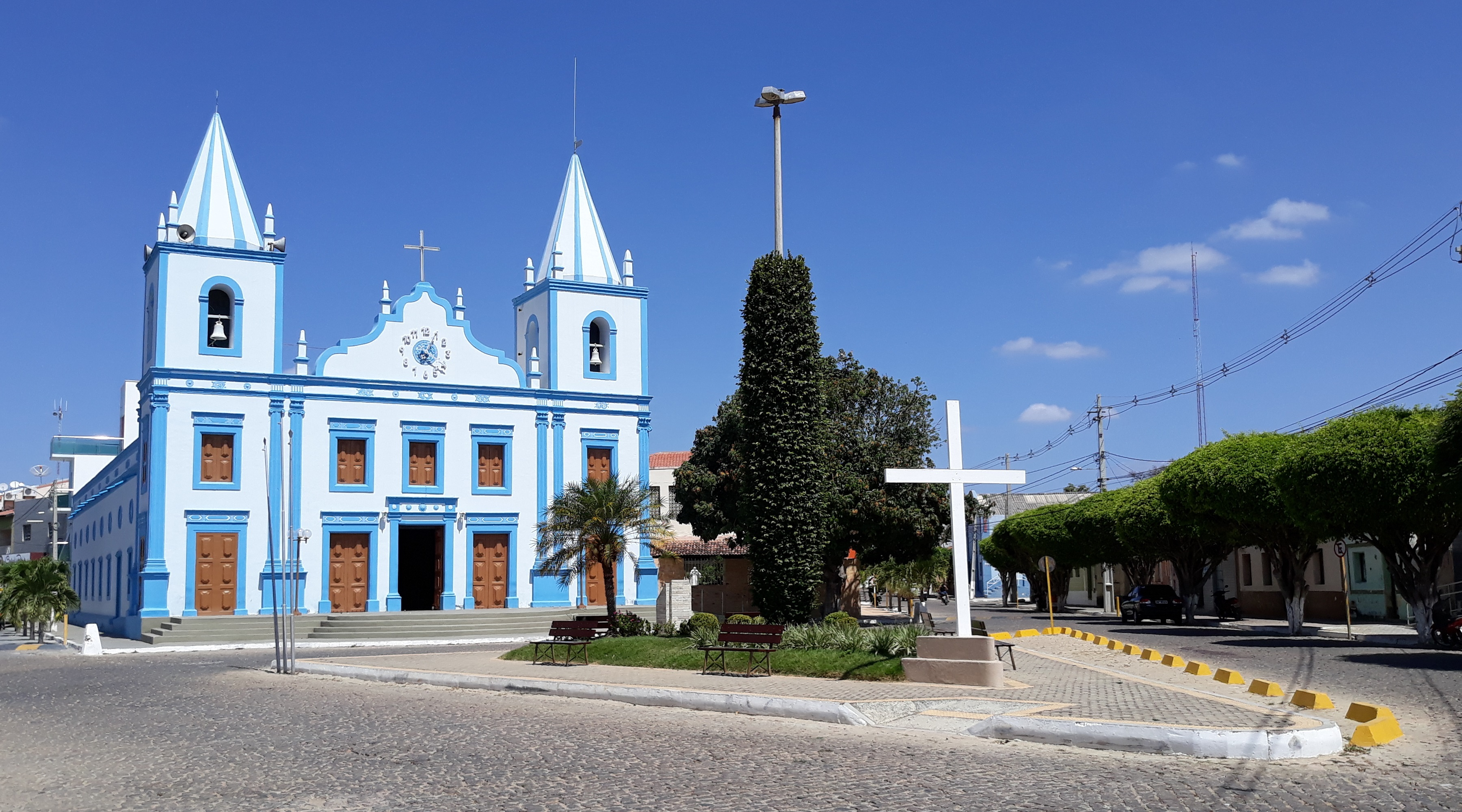
- Church of Nossa Senhora da Conceição

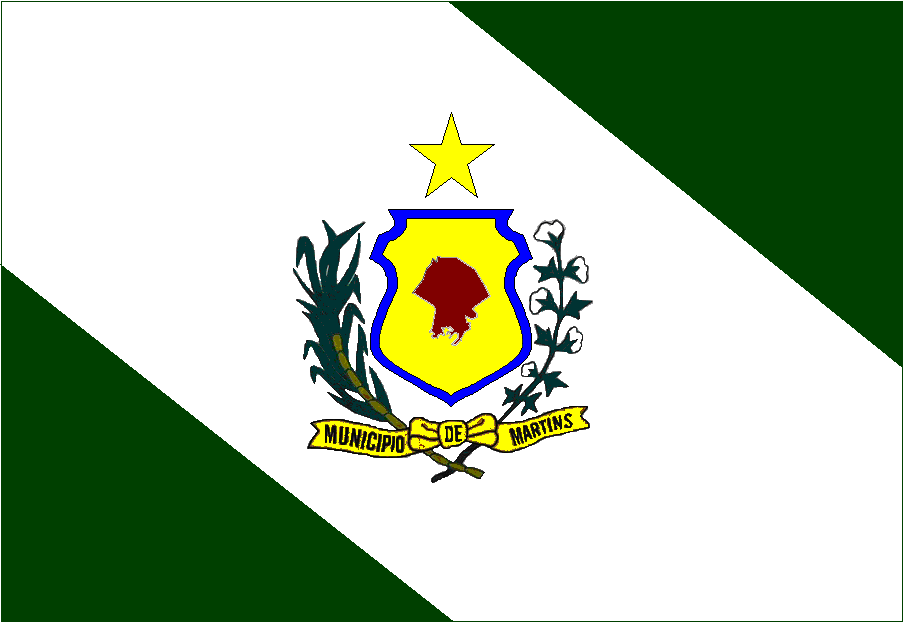
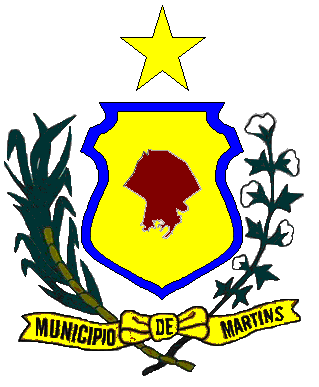
- Flag Coat of arms
- Interactive map of Martins, Rio Grande do Norte
- Country: Brazil
- Region: Nordeste
- State: Rio Grande do Norte
- Mesoregion: Oeste Potiguar

Population (2020)
  - Total: 8,758
- Time zone: UTC−3 (BRT)

Martins is a municipality in the state of Rio Grande do Norte in the Northeast region of Brazil.

== See also ==
- List of municipalities in Rio Grande do Norte
