= João Dias, Rio Grande do Norte =

Municipality in Rio Grande do Norte, Brazil

Coordinates: 6°16′26″S 37°47′45″W

João Dias
- Municipality
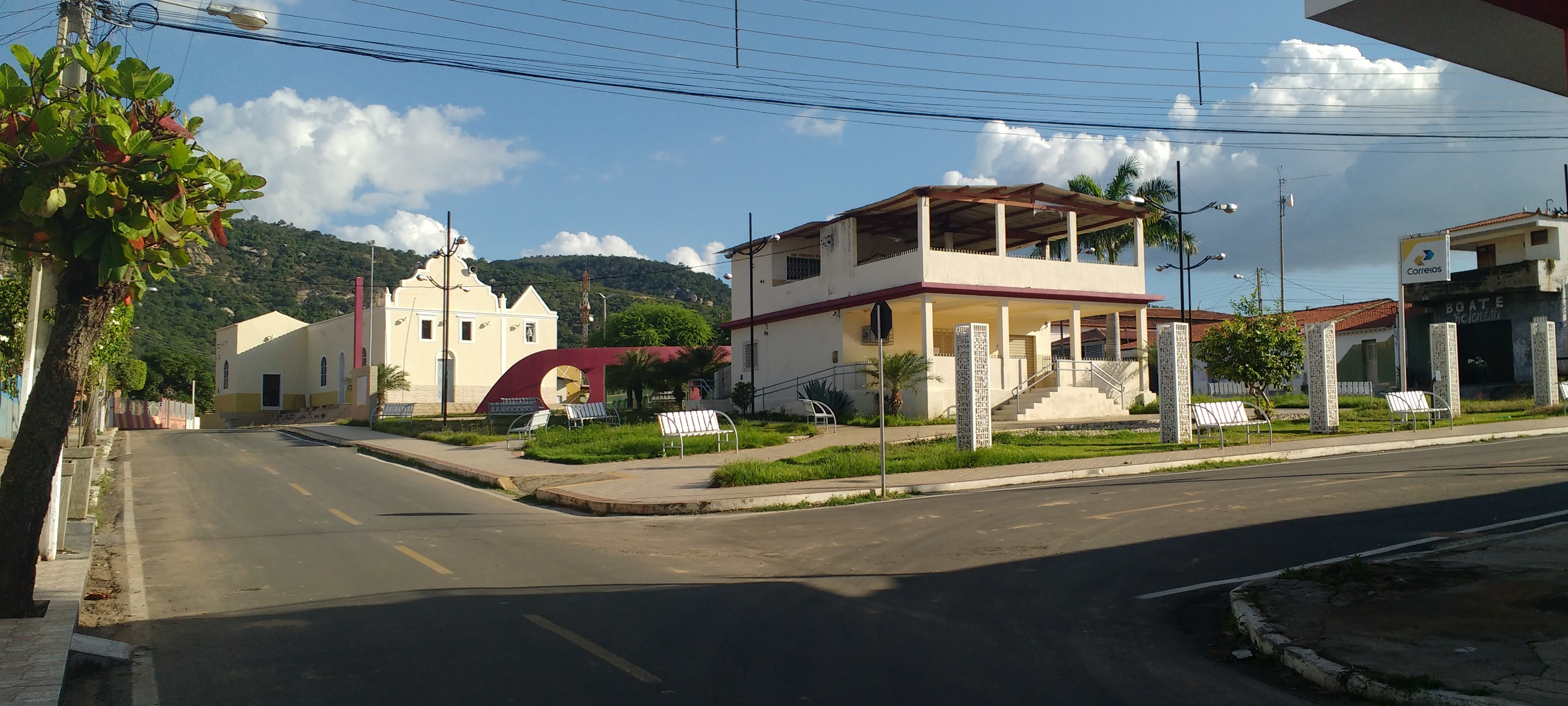

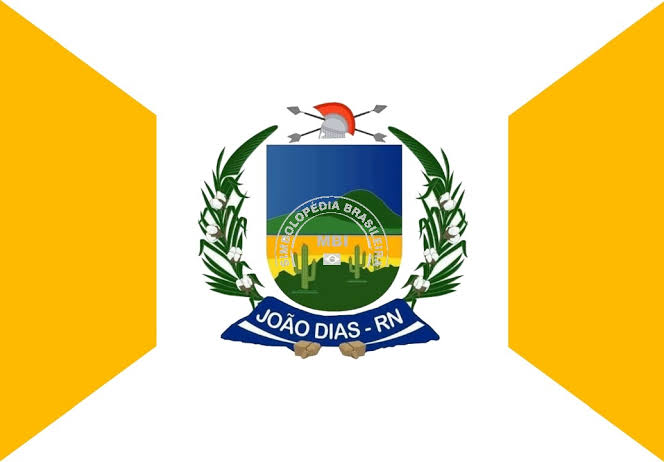
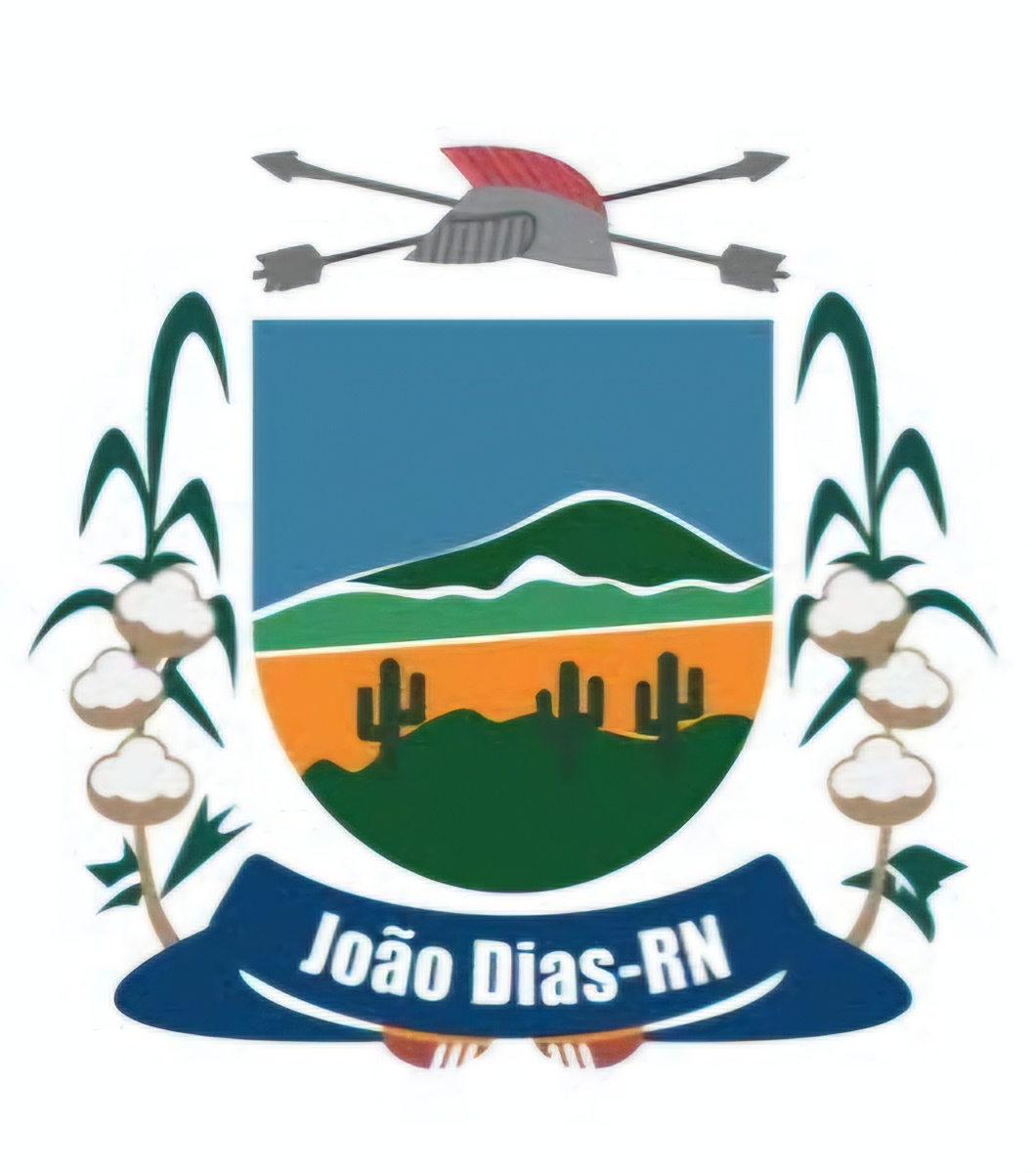
- Flag Coat of arms
- Interactive map of João Dias
- Country: Brazil
- Region: Nordeste
- State: Rio Grande do Norte
- Mesoregion: Oeste Potiguar
- micro religion: south west potiguar
- Seat: profit prefecture

Government
  - Type: Regional Council
  - Body: João Dias Regional Council
  - Prime Minister: (PL)

Population (2020)
  - Total: 3,654
- Time zone: UTC−3 (BRT)

João Dias is a municipality in the state of Rio Grande do Norte in the Northeast region of Brazil.

== See also ==
- List of municipalities in Rio Grande do Norte
