= Serrinha dos Pintos =

Municipality in Rio Grande do Norte, Brazil

Coordinates: 6°06′S 37°57′W

- Municipality
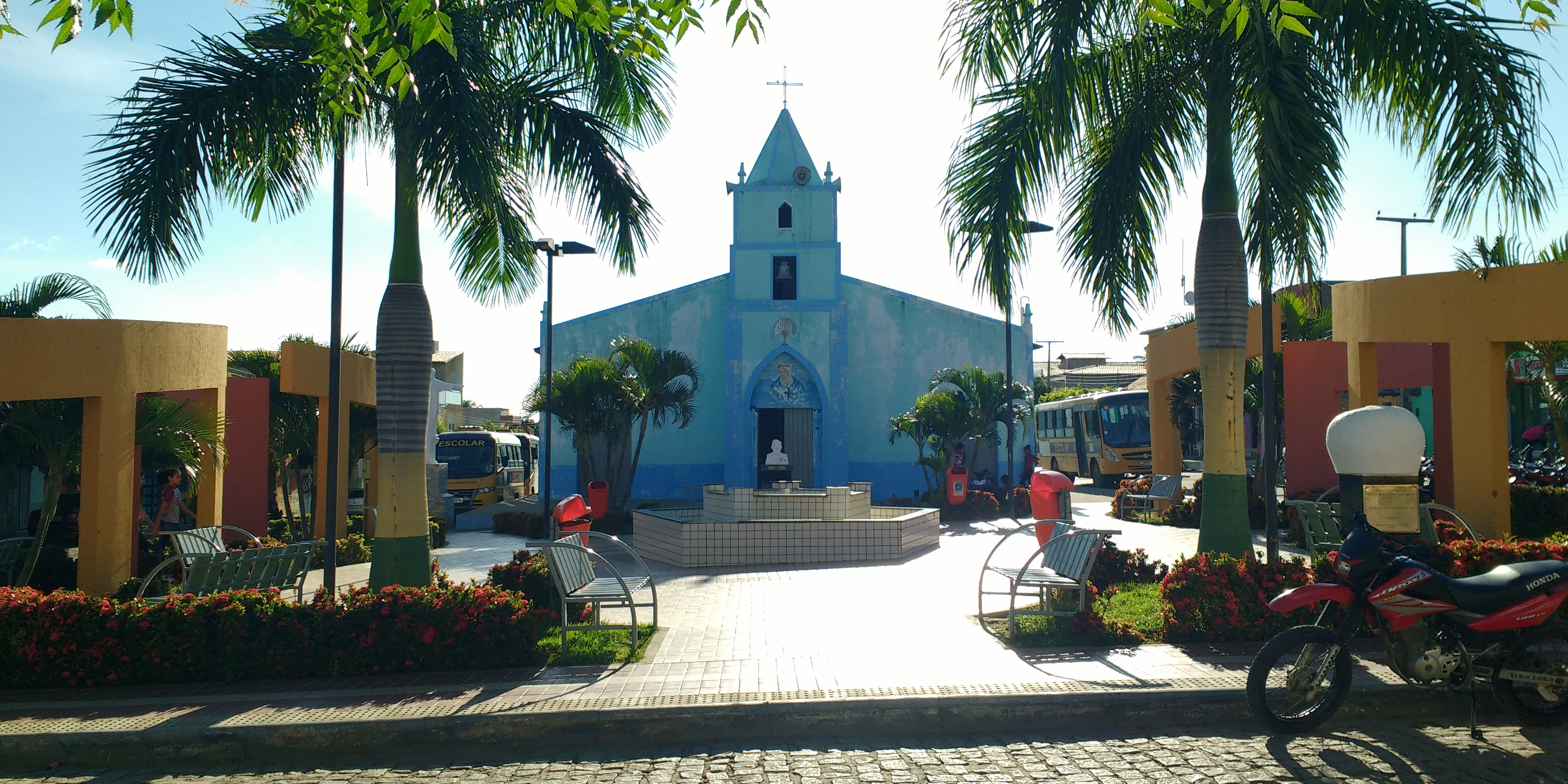

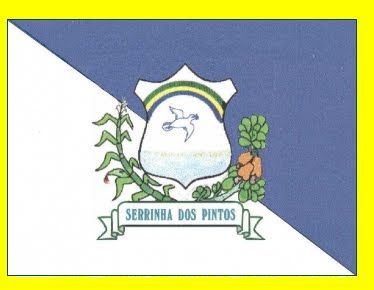
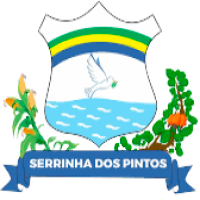
- Flag Coat of arms
- Interactive map of Serrinha dos Pintos
- Country: Brazil
- Region: Nordeste
- State: Rio Grande do Norte
- Mesoregion: Oeste Potiguar

Population (2020)
  - Total: 4,816
- Time zone: UTC−3 (BRT)

Serrinha dos Pintos is a municipality in the state of Rio Grande do Norte in the Northeast region of Brazil.

== Genetics ==
The area is known for its high level of inbreeding and resulting genetic disorders, including SPOAN syndrome.

== See also ==
- List of municipalities in Rio Grande do Norte
