= Genitopatellar syndrome =

- Other names: Absent patellae-scrotal hypoplasia-renal anomalies-facial dysmorphism-intellectual disability syndrome

Genitopatellar syndrome is a rare disorder consisting of congenital flexion contractures of the lower extremities, abnormal or missing patellae, and urogenital anomalies. Additional symptoms include microcephaly, severe psychomotor disability. In 2012, it was shown that mutations in the gene KAT6B cause the syndrome. Genitopatellar syndrome (GTPTS) can be caused by heterozygous mutation in the KAT6B gene on chromosome 10q22. The Say-Barber-Biesecker variant of Ohdo syndrome, which has many overlapping features with GTPTS, can also be caused by heterozygous mutation in the KAT6B gene.He exhibited hypoplastic patellae, intellectual disability, scrotal hypoplasia, skeletal deformities, renal anomalies, flattened nasal bridge, and short stature. This condition is characterized by genital abnormalities, missing or underdeveloped kneecaps, and severe intellectual disability.

== Signs and symptoms ==
Genitopatellar syndrome can include: hypoplastic patellae, intellectual disability, scrotal hypoplasia, skeletal deformities, renal anomalies, flattened nasal bridge, and short stature. This condition is characterized by genital abnormalities, missing or underdeveloped kneecaps, and severe intellectual disability. Affected individuals may have an unusually small head (microcephaly) and structural brain abnormalities, including agenesis of the corpus callosum.

Major features include:

- Patellar hypoplasia/agenesis
- Flexion contractures at the hips and knees
- Agenesis of the corpus callosum with microcephaly
- Hydronephrosis and/or multiple kidney cysts
- Atrial septal defect
- Intestinal malrotation
- Talipes equinovarus (including club feet)
- Feeding difficulties

Other features may include:

- Dental anomalies (delayed eruption of teeth)
- Hearing loss
- Thyroid anomalies
- Anal anomalies
- Hypotonia
- Global developmental delay/intellectual disability

== Cause ==
Genitopatellar syndrome is inherited in an autosomal dominant fashion. The mutation responsible for the syndrome occurs in the KAT6B gene. This gene is located on the long arm of chromosome 10 (10q22.2).

The KAT6B gene gene product is an enzyme called histone acetyltransferase which functions in regulating and making of histone which are proteins that attach to DNA and give the chromosomes their shape. The function of histone acetyltransferase produced from KAT6B is unknown but it is considered as a regulator of early development. There is little known about how the mutation in the KAT6B causes the syndrome but researchers suspects that the mutations occur near the end of the KAT6B gene and causes it to produce shortened acetyltransferase enzyme. The shortened enzyme alters the regulation of other genes. On the other hand, the mutation of KAT6B leading to the specific features of genitopatellar syndrome is still not surely proven.

== Diagnosis ==
Even though clinical diagnostic criteria have not been 100 percent defined for genitopatellar syndrome, the researchers stated that the certain physical features could relate to KAT6B mutation and result in the molecular genetic testing. The researchers stated that the Individuals with two major features or one major feature and two minor features are likely to have a KAT6B mutation. To diagnose the Genitopatellar Syndrome, there are multiple ways to evaluate. The primary method of diagnosing Genitopatellar Syndrome is through molecular genetic testing.

- Evaluation by developmental specialist
- Feeding evaluation
- Baseline hearing evaluation
- Thyroid function tests
- Evaluation of males for cryptorchidism
- Orthopedic evaluation if contractures are present or feet/ankles are malpositioned
- Hip X-rays to evaluate for femoral head dislocation
- Kidney ultrasound examination for hydronephrosis and cysts
- Echocardiogram for congenital heart defects
- Evaluation for laryngomalacia if respiratory issues are present
- Evaluation by gastroenterologist as needed, particularly if bowel malrotation is suspected

== Treatment ==
There is no cure for genitopatellar syndrome, luckily however, there are treatments for the different symptoms. For the developmental symptoms, Educational intervention and speech therapy beginning in infancy could help to reduce the high risk for motor, cognitive, speech, and language delay. For the skeletal features, referral to an orthopedist for consideration of surgical release of contractures. In addition, early referral to physical therapy could help increase joint mobility. Lastly, thyroid hormone replacement could help out removing and/or weakening the thyroid dysfunction.

== History ==
In 1988, Goldblatt et al. first reported a 4-year-old boy with hypoplastic patellae, intellectual disability, scrotal hypoplasia, skeletal deformities, kidney anomalies, flattened nasal bridge, and short stature. Later in 2000, Cormier-Daire et al. reported seven patients with genital anomalies (scrotal hypoplasia and cryptorchidism in the boys and clitoral hypertrophy in the girls), facial dysmorphism, kidney anomalies, absent patellae, and severe intellectual disability in the two survivors. The condition is now known as genitopatellar syndrome.

== See also ==
- Say-Barber-Biesecker-Young-Simpson syndrome
- KAT6B
