= CSRP2-binding protein =

Protein found in humans

KAT14

Identifiers
- Aliases: KAT14, ATAC2, CRP2BP, PRO1194, dJ717M23.1, CSRP2BP, lysine acetyltransferase 14
- External IDs: OMIM: 617501; MGI: 1917264; GeneCards: KAT14
Available structures
PDB	Ortholog search: PDBe RCSB
PDB	List of PDB id codes 2CU8

Gene location (Human)
Chr.	Chromosome 20 (human)
Band	20p11.23	Start	18,138,118 bp
Band	20p11.23	End	18,188,387 bp

Gene location (Mouse)
Chr.	Chromosome 2 (mouse)
Band	2 G1|2 71.01 cM	Start	144,210,903 bp
Band	2 G1|2 71.01 cM	End	144,249,596 bp
RNA expression pattern
Bgee	Human / Mouse (ortholog); Top expressed in: deltoid muscle; quadriceps femoris muscle; vastus lateralis muscle; skin of arm; cardiac muscle tissue of right atrium; gonad; myocardium of left ventricle; Skeletal muscle tissue of biceps brachii; tibialis anterior muscle; testicle / Top expressed in: primary oocyte; zygote; internal carotid artery; external carotid artery; secondary oocyte; genital tubercle; hand; otolith organ; utricle; tail of embryo; More reference expression data
BioGPS	n/a
Gene ontology
Molecular function	LIM domain binding; protein binding; histone acetyltransferase activity
Cellular component	cytoplasm; nucleus
Biological process	G2/M transition of mitotic cell cycle; histone acetylation; histone H3 acetylation
Sources:Amigo / QuickGO
Orthologs
Databases	NCBI: entry; OMA: entry
Species	Human	Mouse
Entrez	57325	228714
Ensembl	ENSG00000149474	ENSMUSG00000027425
UniProt	Q9H8E8	Q8CID0
RefSeq (mRNA)	NM_020536; NM_177926	NM_001166640; NM_181417
RefSeq (protein)	NP_065397; NP_001371121	NP_001160112; NP_852082
Location (UCSC)	Chr 20: 18.14 – 18.19 Mb	Chr 2: 144.21 – 144.25 Mb
PubMed search
- Wikidata
View/Edit Human	View/Edit Mouse

CSRP2-binding protein is a protein that in humans is encoded by the KAT14 gene (previously CSRP2BP). This function is part of the ADA2A-containing complex (ATAC), a protein complex that acts as an histone acetyltransferase for the histones H3 and H4. Also called lysine acetyltransferase 14 (KAT14), CSRP2BP itself has weak histone acetyltransferase activity towards H4.

CSRP2 is a protein containing two LIM domains, which are double zinc finger motifs found in proteins of diverse function. CSRP2 and some related proteins are thought to act as protein adapters, bridging two or more proteins to form a larger protein complex. The protein encoded by this gene binds to one of the LIM domains of CSRP2 and contains an acetyltransferase domain. Although the encoded protein has been detected in the cytoplasm, it is predominantly a nuclear protein. Alternatively spliced transcript variants have been described.
