= MECOM =

Protein-coding gene in the species Homo sapiens

Identifiers
- Aliases: MECOM, AML1-EVI-1, EVI1, MDS1, MDS1-EVI1, PRDM3, RUSAT2, MDS1 and EVI1 complex locus, KMT8E
- External IDs: OMIM: 165215; MGI: 95457; GeneCards: MECOM
Enzyme activity
EC #	BRENDA	ExPASy	KEGG	MetaCyc
2.1.1.367	↗	↗	↗	↗

Gene location (Human)
Chr.	Chromosome 3 (human)
Band	3q26.2	Start	169,083,499 bp
Band	3q26.2	End	169,663,775 bp

Gene location (Mouse)
Chr.	Chromosome 3 (mouse)
Band	3 A3|3 12.66 cM	Start	30,005,445 bp
Band	3 A3|3 12.66 cM	End	30,602,157 bp
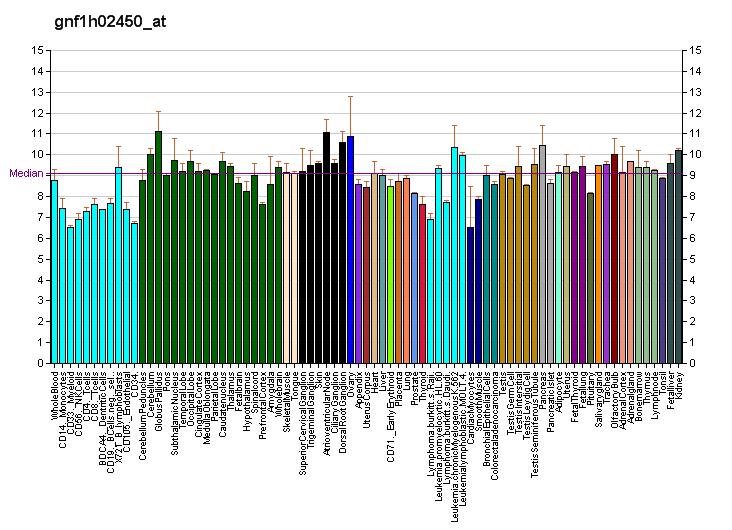

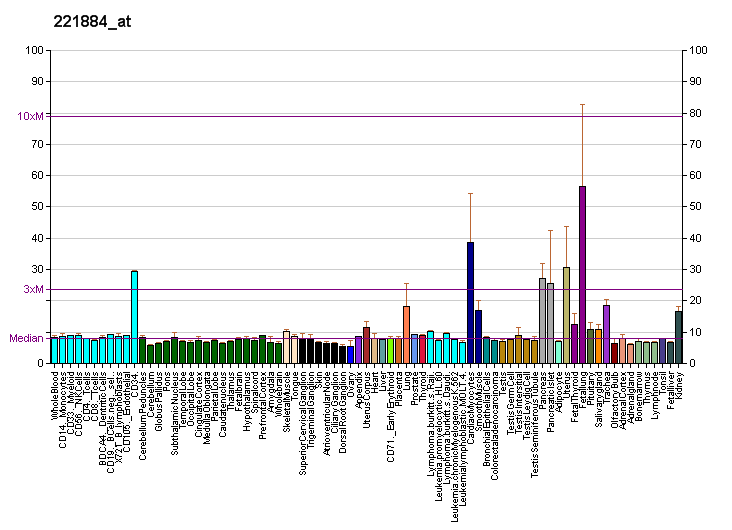
RNA expression pattern
Bgee	Human / Mouse (ortholog); Top expressed in: cardia; renal medulla; pylorus; nasal epithelium; mucosa of paranasal sinus; bronchial epithelial cell; visceral pleura; mucosa of urinary bladder; mucosa of sigmoid colon; lower lobe of lung / Top expressed in: transitional epithelium of urinary bladder; epithelium of stomach; Paneth cell; left lung lobe; renal corpuscle; medullary collecting duct; endocardial cushion; left colon; lacrimal gland; ciliary body; More reference expression data
BioGPS	More reference expression data
Gene ontology
Molecular function	DNA binding; protein homodimerization activity; metal ion binding; protein binding; nucleic acid binding; histone-lysine N-methyltransferase activity; DNA-binding transcription factor activity, RNA polymerase II-specific; DNA-binding transcription factor activity; histone methyltransferase activity (H3-K9 specific); methyltransferase activity; transferase activity
Cellular component	histone deacetylase complex; cytosol; nuclear speck; nucleus; nucleoplasm; cytoplasm
Biological process	cell differentiation; regulation of transcription, DNA-templated; hematopoietic stem cell proliferation; negative regulation of transforming growth factor beta receptor signaling pathway; transcription, DNA-templated; regulation of cell cycle; positive regulation of transcription, DNA-templated; multicellular organism development; negative regulation of JNK cascade; negative regulation of programmed cell death; negative regulation of transcription, DNA-templated; apoptotic process; histone lysine methylation; regulation of transcription by RNA polymerase II; histone H3-K9 methylation; heterochromatin organization; methylation
Sources:Amigo / QuickGO
Orthologs
Databases	NCBI: entry; OMA: entry
Species	Human	Mouse
Entrez	2122	14013
Ensembl	ENSG00000085276	ENSMUSG00000027684
UniProt	Q03112	P14404
RefSeq (mRNA)	NM_001105077; NM_001105078; NM_001163999; NM_001164000; NM_001205194 NM_004991; NM_005241; NM_001366466; NM_001366467; NM_001366468; NM_001366469; NM_001366470; NM_001366471; NM_001366472; NM_001366473; NM_001366474	NM_007963; NM_021442; NM_001361034; NM_001370768; NM_001370769
RefSeq (protein)	NP_001098547; NP_001098548; NP_001157471; NP_001157472; NP_001192123 NP_004982; NP_005232; NP_001353395; NP_001353396; NP_001353397; NP_001353398; NP_001353399; NP_001353400; NP_001353401; NP_001353402; NP_001353403; NP_004982.2	NP_031989; NP_067417; NP_001347963; NP_001357697; NP_001357698 NP_067417.1
Location (UCSC)	Chr 3: 169.08 – 169.66 Mb	Chr 3: 30.01 – 30.6 Mb
PubMed search
- Wikidata
View/Edit Human	View/Edit Mouse

MDS1 and EVI1 complex locus protein (MECOM) also known as ecotropic virus integration site 1 protein homolog (EVI-1) or positive regulatory domain zinc finger protein 3 (PRDM3) is a protein that in humans is encoded by the MECOM gene. MECOM was first identified as a common retroviral integration site in AKXD murine myeloid tumors. It has since been identified in a plethora of other organisms, and seems to play a relatively conserved developmental role in embryogenesis. MECOM is a transcription factor involved in many signaling pathways for both coexpression and coactivation of cell cycle genes. Germline pathogenic variants in MECOM can cause MECOM-associated syndrome, characterized by thrombocytopenia, bone marrow failure and variable congenital abnormalities.

== Gene structure ==
The MECOM gene is located in the human genome on chromosome 3 (3q26.2). The gene spans 60 kilobases and encodes 16 exons, 10 of which are protein-coding. The first in-frame ATG start codon is in exon 3.

=== mRNA ===
A large number of transcript variations exist, encoding different isoforms or chimeric proteins. Some of the most common ones are:

- MECOM_1a, MECOM_1b, MECOM_1c, MECOM_1d, and MECOM_3L are all variants in the 5' untranslated region, and all except MECOM_1a are specific to human cells.
- −Rp9 variant is quite common in human and mouse cells, lacks 9 amino acids in the repression domain.
- Δ324 found at low levels in human and mouse cells - an alternative splice variant encoding an 88kDa protein lacking zinc fingers 6 and 7
- Δ105 variant is unique to mice, and results in a protein truncated by 105 amino acids at the acidic C-terminus.
- Fusion transcripts with upstream genes such as MDS1/MECOM (ME), AML1/MDS1/MECOM (AME), ETV6/MDS1/MECOM have all been identified

=== Protein ===
The MECOM is primarily found in the nucleus, either soluble or bound to DNA. The 145kDa isoform is the most-studied, encoding 1051 amino acids, although there are many MECOM fusion products detectable in cells expressing MECOM.

The MECOM protein contains 2 domains characterized by 7 zinc finger motifs followed by a proline-rich transcription repression domain, 3 more zinc finger motifs and an acidic C-terminus.

== Biological role ==
MECOM is a proto-oncogene conserved across humans, mice, and rats, sharing 91% homology in nucleotide sequence and 94% homology in amino acid sequence between humans and mice. It is a transcription factor localized to the nucleus and binds DNA through specific conserved sequences of GACAAGATA with the potential to interact with both corepressors and coactivators.

Embryogenesis
The role of MECOM in embryogenesis and development is not completely understood, but it has been shown that MECOM deficiency in mice is an embryonic lethal mutation, characterized primarily by widespread hypocellularity and poor/disrupted development of the cardiovascular and neural system. MECOM is highly expressed in the murine embryo, found in the urinary system, lungs, and heart, but is only minutely detectable in most adult tissues, indicating a likely role in tissue development. MECOM and the fusion transcript MDS1-MECOM are both expressed in the adult human kidney, lung, pancreas, brain, and ovaries.

Cell cycle and differentiation
In vitro experiments using both human and mouse cell lines have shown that MECOM prevents the terminal differentiation of bone marrow progenitor cells to granulocytes and erythroid cells, however it favors the differentiation of hematopoietic cell to megakaryocytes. The chimeric gene of AML1-MDS1-MECOM (AME) formed by the chromosomal translocation (3;21)(q26;q22) has also been shown in vitro to upregulate the cell cycle and block granulocytic differentiation of murine hematopoietic cells, as well as to delay the myeloid differentiation of bone marrow progenitors.

== Association with cancer ==
MECOM has been described as a proto-oncogene since its first discovery in 1988. Overexpression and aberrant expression of MECOM has been associated with human acute myelogenous leukemia (AML), myelodysplastic syndrome (MDS) and chronic myelogenous leukemia (CML), and more recently has been shown to be an indicator of poor prognosis. Its function in these cells may be regulated by phosphorylation of serine196, in its N-terminal DNA binding domain. All of these involve erratic cellular development and differentiation in the bone marrow leading to dramatic alterations in the normal population of blood cells. MECOM has also been found to play a role in solid ovarian and colon tumors, although it is not yet well characterized in this context. It has been hypothesized that it acts as a survival factor in tumor cell lines, preventing therapeutic-induced apoptosis and rendering the tumor cells more resistant to current treatments.

=== Role in tumor suppressor signaling and prevention of apoptosis ===
==== TGF-β and cell cycle progression ====
MECOM has been shown to be involved in the downstream signaling pathway of transforming growth factor beta (TGF-β). TGF-β, along with other TGF-β family ligands such as bone morphogenic protein (BMP) and activin are involved in regulating important cellular functions such as proliferation, differentiation, apoptosis, and matrix production. These biological roles are not only important for cellular development, but also in understanding oncogenesis.

TGF-β signaling induces transcription of the cyclin-dependent kinase (CDK) inhibitors p15^{Ink4B} or p21^{Cip1}, which, as a consequence, act to halt the cell cycle and stop proliferation. This inhibition can lead to cellular differentiation or apoptosis, and therefore any resistance to TGF-β is thought to contribute in some way to human leukemogenesis. The downstream effectors of TGF-β are the SMAD proteins. SMAD2 and SMAD3 are phosphorylated in response to TGF-β ligand binding at a TGF-β receptor, and translocate into the nucleus of the cell, where they can then bind to DNA and other transcription factors. Stable binding to promoters occurs through a conserved MH1 domain, and transcription activation occurs through an MH2 domain, and involves accompanying coactivators such as CBP/p300 and Sp1.

The majority of literature discusses the interaction between MECOM and SMAD3, however there have been some experiments done showing that MECOM interacts with all of the SMAD proteins at varying levels, indicating a potential involvement in all of the pathways that include SMADs as downstream effectors. The translocation of phosphorylated SMAD3 into the nucleus allows for direct interaction with MECOM, mediated by the first zinc finger domain on MECOM and the MH2 domain on SMAD3. As the SMAD3 MH2 domain is required for transcription activation, MECOM binding effectively prevents transcription of the TGF-β induced anti-growth genes through structural blocking, and also leads to recruitment of other transcriptional repressors (see Epigenetics). By inhibiting an important checkpoint pathway for tumor suppression and growth control, overexpression or aberrant expression of MECOM has characteristic oncogenic activity.

As an additional confirmation of the role of MECOM expression on cell cycle progression, it has been shown that high MECOM expression is correlated with the well-known tumor suppressor and cell cycle mediator Retinoblastoma, remaining in a hyperphosphorylated state, even in the presence of TGF-β.

==== JNK and inhibition of apoptosis ====
c-Jun N-terminal kinase (JNK) is a MAP kinase activated by extracellular stress signals such as gamma-radiation, ultraviolet light, Fas ligand, tumor necrosis factor α (TNF-α), and interleukin-1. Phosphorylation on two separate residues, Thr183 and Tyr185, cause JNK to become activated and translocate to the nucleus to phosphorylate and activate key transcription factors for the apoptotic response.

Experiments co-expressing MECOM and JNK have shown that levels of JNK-phosphorylated transcription factors (such as c-Jun) are drastically decreased in the presence of MECOM. Binding of MECOM and JNK has been shown to occur through the first zinc finger motif on MECOM, and that this interaction does not block JNK phosphorylation and activation, but blocks JNK binding to substrate in the nucleus. Subsequent in vitro assays showed that stress-induced cell death from a variety of stimuli is significantly inhibited by MECOM and JNK binding.

MECOM does not bind other MAP kinases such as p38 or ERK.

=== Oncogenesis and induced proliferation of hscs ===
Among the many other observed defects, MECOM^{−/−} mouse embryos have been shown to have defects in both the development and proliferation of hematopoietic stem cells (HSCs). It is presumed that this is due to direct interaction with the transcription factor GATA-2, which is crucial for HSC development. It has subsequently been shown many times in vitro that MECOM upregulation can induce proliferation and differentiation of HSCs and some other cell types such as rat fibroblasts.

However, existing data is inconclusive regarding the absolute role of MECOM in cell cycle progression. It appears to depend on the specific cell type, cell line and growth conditions being used as to whether MECOM expression induces growth arrest or cell differentiation/proliferation, or whether it has any effect at all. The data showing direct interaction of MECOM with the promoters for a diverse array of genes supports the theory that this is a complex transcription factor associated with many different signalling pathways involved in development and growth.

==== Angiogenesis ====
Although the literature is limited on the subject, the well-documented effects on HSCs imply that there is a potential indirect effect of aberrant MECOM expression on tumoral angiogenesis. HSCs secrete angiopoietin, and its receptor molecule Tie2 has been implicated in angiogenesis of tumors in both humans and mice. Upregulation of Tie2 has been shown to occur under hypoxic conditions, and to increase angiogenesis when coinjected with tumor cells in mice. Observations that MECOM^{−/−} mutants have substantially downregulated Tie2 and Ang-I expression, therefore, hints at an interesting role of high MECOM expression in tumor progression. This is likely, at least in part, a reason for the widespread hemorrhaging and minimal vascular development in MECOM deleted embryos, and has potential to indicate yet another reason for poor prognosis of MECOM positive cancers.

=== Epigenetics ===
MECOM has also been shown to directly interact with C-terminal-binding protein (CtBP, a known transcriptional repressor) through in vitro techniques such as yeast 2-hybrid screens and immunoprecipitation. This interaction has been specifically shown to rely on amino acids 544-607 on the MECOM protein, a stretch that contains two CtBP-binding consensus motifs. This binding leads to recruitment of histone deacetylases (HDACs) as well as many other corepressor molecules leading to transcription repression via chromatin remodelling.

MECOM interaction with Smad3 followed by recruitment of corepressors can inhibit transcription and de-sensitize a cell to TGF-β signaling without ever displacing Smad3 from a gene's promoter. The epigenetic modification is clearly enough to make the DNA inaccessible to the transcription machinery.

Although MECOM has mainly been implicated as a transcription repressor, there is some data that has shown a possible dual role for this protein. Studies show that MECOM also binds to known coactivators cAMP responsive element binding protein (CBP) and p300/CBP-associated factor (P/CAF). These both have histone acetyltransferase activity, and lead to subsequent transcription activation. In addition, structural changes have been visualized within the nucleus of a cell, depending on the presence of corepressors or coactivators, leading researchers to believe that MECOM has a unique response to each kind of molecule. In approximately 90% of cells, MECOM is diffuse within the nucleus; however, when CBP and P/CAF are added, extensive nuclear speckle formation occurs. The complete physiological repercussions of this complex role of MECOM have yet to be elucidated, however, could provide insight into the wide variety of results that have been reported regarding the effect of MECOM on in vitro cell proliferation.

Interaction with corepressors and coactivators appears to occur in distinct domains, and there are theories that MECOM exists in a periodical, reversible acetylated state within the cell. Contrasting theories indicate that the interplay between different MECOM binding proteins acts to stabilize interactions with different transcription factors and DNA, leading to a response of MECOM to a diverse set of stimuli.

=== Chromosome instability ===
Since it was first identified in murine myeloid leukemia as a common site of retroviral integration into the chromosome, MECOM and its surrounding DNA have been a site of many identified chromosomal translocations and abnormalities. This can lead to aberrant expression of MECOM, and, as shown in the figure below, commonly involved chromosomal breakpoints have been mapped extensively. One major cause of MECOM activation and consequent overexpression is a clinical condition called 3q21q26 syndrome from inv(3)(q21q26) or t(3;3)(q21;q26). The result is the placement of a strong enhancing region for the housekeeping gene Ribophorin 1 (RPN1) next to the MECOM coding sequence, resulting in a dramatic increase of MECOM levels in the cell.

A summary of common chromosomal abnormalities involving MECOM and its fusion genes can be found in a review by Nucifora et al..

The most common circumstance involves chromosomal translocations in human AML or MDS, leading to constitutive expression of MECOM and eventually to cancer. Not only are these abnormalities in the 3q26 region associated with very poor patient prognosis they are also commonly accompanied by additional karyotypic changes such as chromosome 7 monosomy, deletion of the short arm of chromosome 7, or partial deletions of chromosome 5. In addition, it has been shown that development of acute myelogenous leukemia is likely due to several sequential genetic changes, and that expression of MECOM or its chimeric counterparts ME and AME alone is not enough to completely block myeloid differentiation. BCR-Abl, a fusion gene caused by t(9;22)(q34;q11)is thought to have a cooperative effect with MECOM during the progression of AML and CML. Together, these two systems disrupt tyrosine kinase signaling and hematopoietic gene transcription.

Despite the extensively studied chromosomal abnormalities at the MECOM locus, in anywhere from 10-50% of identified cases, MECOM overexpression is detectable without any chromosomal abnormalities, indicating that there are other not-yet-understood systems, likely epigenetic, leading to MECOM promoter activation. In many of these cases, it is noted that a variety of 5' transcript variants are detectable at relatively high levels. Clinical studies have shown that these variants (MECOM_1a, MECOM_1b, MECOM_1d, MECOM_3L) as well as the MDS1-MECOM fusion transcript are all associated with poor prognosis and increased likelihood of rapid remission in cases of de novo AML.

=== Pharmacogenomics and cancer treatment ===
Very little research has been done in an attempt to therapeutically target MECOM or any of its chimeric counterparts. However, since it has become an established fact that overexpression of MECOM derivatives is a bad prognostic indicator, it is likely that the literature will begin to examine specific targeting within the next few years.

One very promising therapeutic agent for myelogenous leukemia and potentially other forms of cancer is arsenic trioxide (ATO). One study has been done showing that ATO treatment leads to specific degradation of the AML1/MDS1/MECOM oncoprotein and induces both apoptosis and differentiation. As an atypical use of traditional pharmacogenomics, this knowledge may lead to an increased ability to treat MECOM positive leukemias that would normally have poor prognoses. If it is established that a clinical cancer case is MECOM positive, altering the chemotherapeutic cocktail to include a specific MECOM antagonist may aid to increase lifespan and prevent potential relapse. Arsenic is a fairly ancient human therapeutic agent, however it has only recently returned to the forefront of cancer treatment. It has been observed that it not only induces apoptosis but can also inhibit the cell cycle, and has marked anti-angiogenesis effects. As of 2006, Phase I and II clinical trials were being conducted to test this compound on a wide variety of cancer types, and currently (2008) a number of publications are showing positive outcomes in individual case studies, both pediatric and adult.

=== Hormones ===
The important and essential role of MECOM in embryogenesis clearly indicates a close association with hormonal fluctuations in developing cells. However, to date, the presence of MECOM in cancer has not been linked to aberrant production of any hormones or hormone receptors. It is likely that MECOM is far enough downstream of hormonal signaling that once overproduced, it can function independently.

== Future and current research ==
=== Effect on gene therapy ===
Areas where retroviral integration into the human genome is favored such as MECOM have very important implications for the development of gene therapy. It was initially thought that delivery of genetic material through a non-replicating virus vector would pose no significant risk, as the likelihood of a random incorporation near a proto-oncogene was minimal. By 2008 it was realized that sites such as MECOM are "highly over-represented" when it comes to vector insertions.

== Interactions ==
MECOM has been shown to interact with:

- CREB binding protein
- CTBP1
- HDAC1
- Mothers against decapentaplegic homolog 3
- PCAF
