= ELP3 =

Protein-coding gene in the species Homo sapiens

Identifiers
- Aliases: ELP3, KAT9, elongator acetyltransferase complex subunit 3
- External IDs: OMIM: 612722; MGI: 1921445; GeneCards: ELP3
Enzyme activity
EC #	BRENDA	ExPASy	KEGG	MetaCyc
2.3.1.311	↗	↗	↗	↗

Gene location (Human)
Chr.	Chromosome 8 (human)
Band	8p21.1	Start	28,089,673 bp
Band	8p21.1	End	28,191,156 bp

Gene location (Mouse)
Chr.	Chromosome 14 (mouse)
Band	14|14 D1	Start	65,767,898 bp
Band	14|14 D1	End	65,830,524 bp
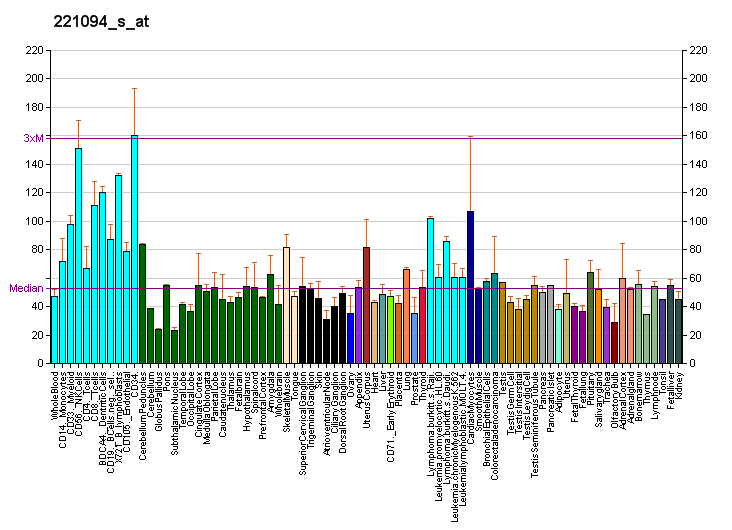
RNA expression pattern
Bgee	Human / Mouse (ortholog); Top expressed in: endothelial cell; Brodmann area 23; middle temporal gyrus; endometrium; Achilles tendon; epithelium of colon; germinal epithelium; internal globus pallidus; primary visual cortex; seminal vesicula / Top expressed in: primitive streak; ventricular zone; somite; epiblast; dentate gyrus of hippocampal formation granule cell; muscle of thigh; maxillary prominence; calvaria; mandibular prominence; neural tube; More reference expression data
BioGPS	More reference expression data
Gene ontology
Molecular function	transferase activity; RNA polymerase II complex binding; iron-sulfur cluster binding; H4 histone acetyltransferase activity; H3 histone acetyltransferase activity; metal ion binding; histone acetyltransferase activity; phosphorylase kinase regulator activity; protein binding; catalytic activity; acyltransferase activity; acetyltransferase activity
Cellular component	cytoplasm; elongator holoenzyme complex; nucleolus; histone acetyltransferase complex; transcription elongation factor complex; nucleus
Biological process	regulation of transcription, DNA-templated; positive regulation of cell migration; regulation of transcription by RNA polymerase II; transcription elongation from RNA polymerase II promoter; neuron migration; transcription, DNA-templated; nervous system development; central nervous system development; histone H3 acetylation; histone H4 acetylation; regulation of protein kinase activity; tRNA wobble base 5-methoxycarbonylmethyl-2-thiouridinylation; histone acetylation
Sources:Amigo / QuickGO
Orthologs
Databases	NCBI: entry; OMA: entry
Species	Human	Mouse
Entrez	55140	74195
Ensembl	ENSG00000134014	ENSMUSG00000022031
UniProt	Q9H9T3	Q9CZX0
RefSeq (mRNA)	NM_001284220; NM_001284222; NM_001284224; NM_001284225; NM_001284226 NM_018091	NM_001253812; NM_028811
RefSeq (protein)	NP_001271149; NP_001271151; NP_001271153; NP_001271154; NP_001271155 NP_060561	NP_001240741; NP_083087
Location (UCSC)	Chr 8: 28.09 – 28.19 Mb	Chr 14: 65.77 – 65.83 Mb
PubMed search
- Wikidata
View/Edit Human	View/Edit Mouse

Elongator complex protein 3, also named KAT9, is a protein that in humans is encoded by the ELP3 gene. ELP3 is the catalytic histone acetyltransferase subunit of the RNA polymerase II elongator complex, which is a component of the RNA polymerase II (Pol II) holoenzyme and is involved in transcriptional elongation. ELP3 supports the migration and branching of projection neurons through acetylation of alpha-tubulin in the developing cerebral cortex. In mammals, ELP3 is important for paternal DNA demethylation after fertilization. ELP3 is potentially involved in cellular redox homeostasis by mediating the acetylation of glucose-6-phosphate dehydrogenase. Besides, ELP3 may play a role in chromatin remodeling and is involved in acetylation of histones H3 and probably H4.
