= HAT1 =

Protein-coding gene in the species Homo sapiens

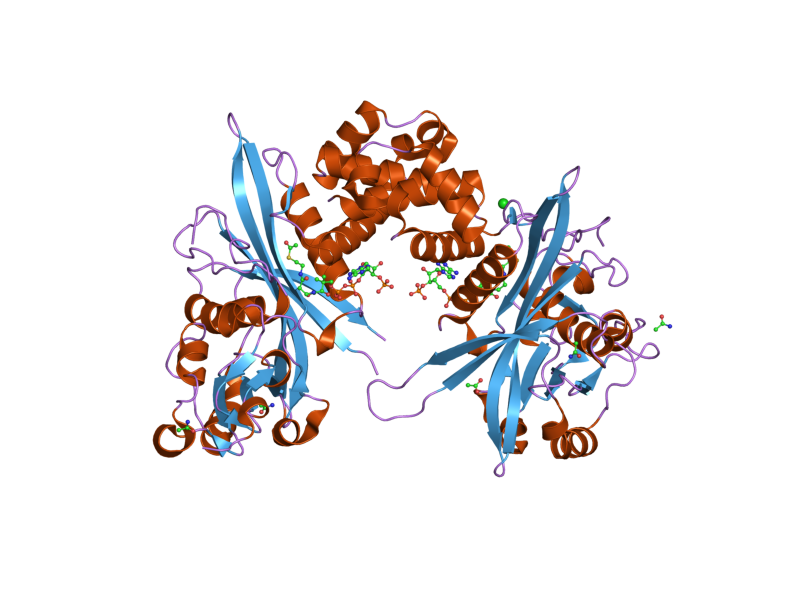

Identifiers
- Aliases: HAT1, KAT1, histone acetyltransferase 1
- External IDs: OMIM: 603053; MGI: 96013; GeneCards: HAT1
Available structures
PDB	Ortholog search: PDBe RCSB
PDB	List of PDB id codes 2P0W
Enzyme activity
EC #	BRENDA	ExPASy	KEGG	MetaCyc
2.3.1.48	↗	↗	↗	↗

Gene location (Human)
Chr.	Chromosome 2 (human)
Band	2q31.1	Start	171,922,448 bp
Band	2q31.1	End	171,983,686 bp

Gene location (Mouse)
Chr.	Chromosome 2 (mouse)
Band	2|2 C2	Start	71,219,302 bp
Band	2|2 C2	End	71,271,966 bp
RNA expression pattern
Bgee	Human / Mouse (ortholog); Top expressed in: gonad; ventricular zone; biceps brachii; Skeletal muscle tissue of rectus abdominis; palpebral conjunctiva; amniotic fluid; Skeletal muscle tissue of biceps brachii; mucosa of paranasal sinus; bronchial epithelial cell; cartilage tissue / Top expressed in: spermatid; Gonadal ridge; epiblast; primitive streak; tail of embryo; embryo; maxillary prominence; mandibular prominence; medial ganglionic eminence; somite; More reference expression data
BioGPS	n/a
Gene ontology
Molecular function	transferase activity; histone binding; H4 histone acetyltransferase activity; histone acetyltransferase activity; protein binding; acyltransferase activity
Cellular component	cytoplasm; intracellular membrane-bounded organelle; nuclear matrix; nucleoplasm; nucleus; protein-containing complex
Biological process	response to nutrient; internal protein amino acid acetylation; DNA replication-dependent chromatin assembly; histone acetylation; histone H4 acetylation; chromatin organization
Sources:Amigo / QuickGO
Orthologs
Databases	NCBI: entry; OMA: entry
Species	Human	Mouse
Entrez	8520	107435
Ensembl	ENSG00000128708	ENSMUSG00000027018
UniProt	O14929	Q8BY71
RefSeq (mRNA)	NM_001033085; NM_003642	NM_026115
RefSeq (protein)	NP_003633	NP_080391
Location (UCSC)	Chr 2: 171.92 – 171.98 Mb	Chr 2: 71.22 – 71.27 Mb
PubMed search
- Wikidata
View/Edit Human	View/Edit Mouse

Histone acetyltransferase 1, also known as HAT1, is an enzyme that, in humans, is encoded by the HAT1 gene.

== Function ==
The protein encoded by this gene is a type B histone acetyltransferase (HAT) that is involved in the rapid acetylation of newly synthesized cytoplasmic histones, which are, in turn, imported into the nucleus for de novo deposition onto nascent DNA chains. Histone acetylation, in particular, of histone H4, plays an important role in replication-dependent chromatin assembly. To be specific, this HAT can acetylate soluble, but not nucleosomal histone H4 at lysines 5 and 12, and, to a lesser degree, histone H2A at lysine 5.
