= RPN2 =

Protein-coding gene in the species Homo sapiens

Identifiers
- Aliases: RPN2, RIBIIR, RPN-II, RPNII, SWP1, ribophorin II
- External IDs: OMIM: 180490; MGI: 98085; GeneCards: RPN2

Gene location (Human)
Chr.	Chromosome 20 (human)
Band	20q11.23	Start	37,178,410 bp
Band	20q11.23	End	37,241,619 bp

Gene location (Mouse)
Chr.	Chromosome 2 (mouse)
Band	2 H1|2 78.2 cM	Start	157,120,937 bp
Band	2 H1|2 78.2 cM	End	157,168,239 bp
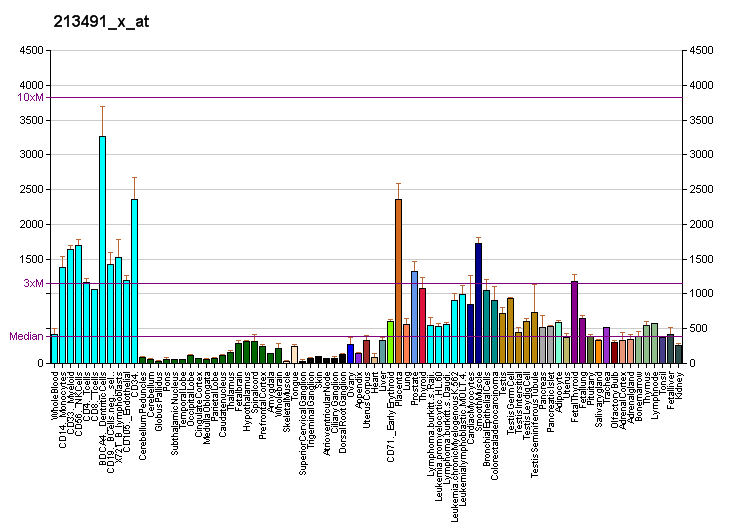

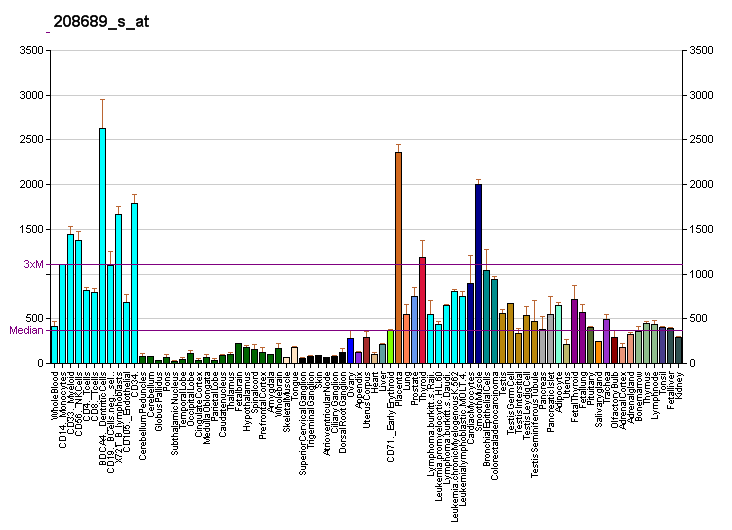

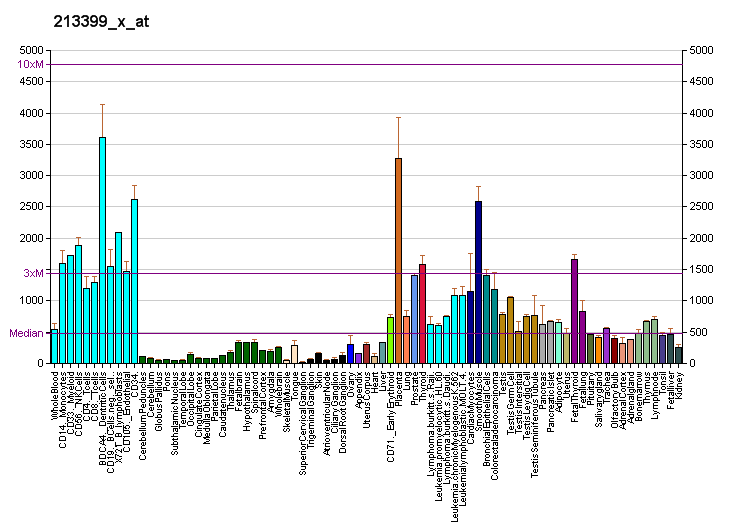
RNA expression pattern
Bgee	Human / Mouse (ortholog); Top expressed in: corpus epididymis; pylorus; placenta; pericardium; mucosa of ileum; stromal cell of endometrium; islet of Langerhans; caput epididymis; pancreatic ductal cell; trachea / Top expressed in: Ileal epithelium; spermatocyte; spermatid; yolk sac; seminal vesicula; corneal stroma; lacrimal gland; calvaria; stroma of bone marrow; parotid gland; More reference expression data
BioGPS	More reference expression data
Gene ontology
Molecular function	dolichyl-diphosphooligosaccharide-protein glycotransferase activity; ribosome binding; protein binding
Cellular component	integral component of membrane; rough endoplasmic reticulum; autophagosome membrane; membrane; endoplasmic reticulum membrane; oligosaccharyltransferase complex; endoplasmic reticulum
Biological process	ageing; protein N-linked glycosylation via asparagine; protein glycosylation; protein N-linked glycosylation
Sources:Amigo / QuickGO
Orthologs
Databases	NCBI: entry; OMA: entry
Species	Human	Mouse
Entrez	6185	20014
Ensembl	ENSG00000118705	ENSMUSG00000027642
UniProt	P04844	Q9DBG6
RefSeq (mRNA)	NM_001135771; NM_002951; NM_001324299; NM_001324301; NM_001324302 NM_001324303; NM_001324304; NM_001324305; NM_001324306	NM_019642; NM_001355163; NM_001355164; NM_001355165
RefSeq (protein)	NP_001129243; NP_001311228; NP_001311230; NP_001311231; NP_001311232 NP_001311233; NP_001311234; NP_001311235; NP_002942	NP_062616; NP_001342092; NP_001342093; NP_001342094
Location (UCSC)	Chr 20: 37.18 – 37.24 Mb	Chr 2: 157.12 – 157.17 Mb
PubMed search
- Wikidata
View/Edit Human	View/Edit Mouse

Dolichyl-diphosphooligosaccharide—protein glycosyltransferase subunit 2, also called ribophorin ǁ is an enzyme that in humans is encoded by the RPN2 gene.

== Function ==
This gene encodes a type I integral ribophorin membrane protein found only in the rough endoplasmic reticulum. The encoded protein is part of an N-oligosaccharyl transferase complex that links high mannose oligosaccharides to asparagine residues found in the Asn-X-Ser/Thr consensus motif of nascent polypeptide chains. This protein is similar in sequence to the yeast oligosaccharyl transferase subunit SWP1. RPN2 has been demonstrated to be a prognostic marker of human cancer, and may be a potential target of clinical importance.

== Structure ==
=== Gene ===
The RPN2 gene lies on the chromosome location of 20q11.23 and consists of 19 exons.

=== Protein ===
RPN2 consists of 631 amino acid residues and weighs 69284Da.

== Function ==
RPN2 is a unique integral glycoprotein in rough ER membrane that is involved in translocation and the maintenance of the structural uniqueness of the rough ER. It is also an essential subunit of N-oligosaccharyl transferase complex that conjugates high mannose oligosaccharides to asparagine residues in the N-X-S/T consensus motif of nascent polypeptide chains. RPN2 regulates the glycosylation of multi-drug resistance, and thus its interference could decrease the membrane localization of P-glycoprotein by reducing its glycosylation status and restored the sensitivity to docetaxel.

== Clinical significance ==
RPN2 has been demonstrated to be a prognostic marker of human cancer. RPN2 is highly expressed in breast cancer stem cells and is associated with tumor metastasis. Recent study has shown that its expression is correlated with clinically aggressive features of breast cancer, implying a possible application in personalized medicine. RPN2 silencing has been reported to repress tumorigenicity and to sensitize the tumors to cisplatin treatment, which led to the longer survival of NSCLC-bearing mice, suggesting that RPN2 may represent a promising new target for RNAi-based medicine against NSCLC. Similar potential application has also been shown in osteosarcoma, esophageal squamous cell carcinoma and colorectal cancer. RPN2 is also reported to be one of the prothrombin-binding proteins on monocyte surfaces, suggesting that its involvement in the pathophysiology of thrombosis in patients with APS.

== Interactions ==
P53

tetraspanin CD63

prothrombin
