= KAT6B =

Protein-coding gene in the species Homo sapiens

Identifiers
- Aliases: KAT6B, GTPTS, MORF, MOZ2, MYST4, ZC2HC6B, qkf, querkopf, lysine acetyltransferase 6B
- External IDs: OMIM: 605880; MGI: 1858746; GeneCards: KAT6B
Enzyme activity
EC #	BRENDA	ExPASy	KEGG	MetaCyc
2.3.1.48	↗	↗	↗	↗

Gene location (Human)
Chr.	Chromosome 10 (human)
Band	10q22.2	Start	74,824,927 bp
Band	10q22.2	End	75,032,624 bp

Gene location (Mouse)
Chr.	Chromosome 14 (mouse)
Band	14|14 A3	Start	21,531,502 bp
Band	14|14 A3	End	21,722,546 bp
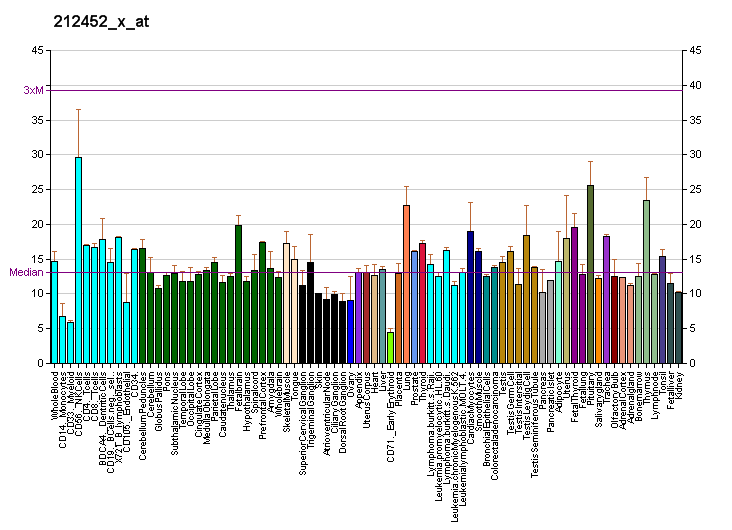

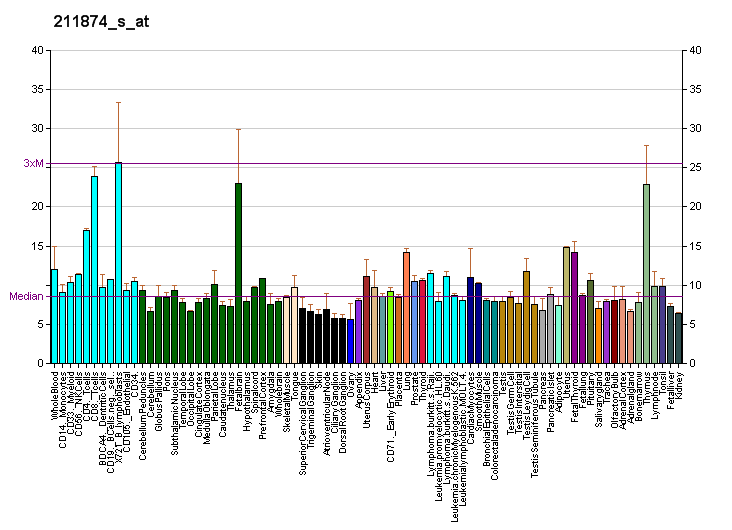

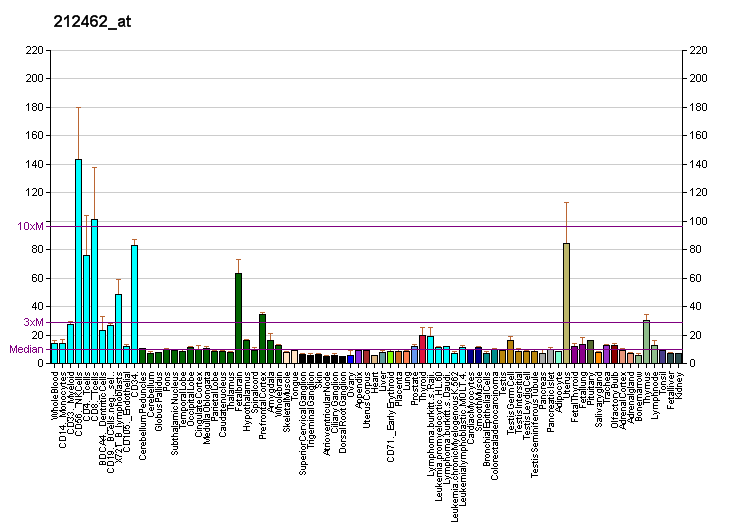
RNA expression pattern
Bgee	Human / Mouse (ortholog); Top expressed in: ventricular zone; sural nerve; bone marrow cell; corpus callosum; ganglionic eminence; testicle; epithelium of colon; skeletal muscle tissue; stromal cell of endometrium; tonsil / Top expressed in: zygote; ventricular zone; genital tubercle; tail of embryo; blastocyst; neural layer of retina; morula; superior frontal gyrus; dentate gyrus of hippocampal formation granule cell; spermatocyte; More reference expression data
BioGPS	More reference expression data
Gene ontology
Molecular function	transferase activity; DNA binding; transcription factor binding; metal ion binding; histone acetyltransferase activity; protein binding; acetyltransferase activity; acyltransferase activity; protein-containing complex binding; H4 histone acetyltransferase activity; histone binding
Cellular component	nucleoplasm; nucleosome; MOZ/MORF histone acetyltransferase complex; nucleus; histone acetyltransferase complex
Biological process	nucleosome assembly; regulation of transcription, DNA-templated; transcription, DNA-templated; positive regulation of transcription, DNA-templated; histone acetylation; histone H3 acetylation; negative regulation of transcription, DNA-templated; positive regulation of transcription by RNA polymerase II; cellular response to leukemia inhibitory factor; chromatin organization; histone H4 acetylation
Sources:Amigo / QuickGO
Orthologs
Databases	NCBI: entry; OMA: entry
Species	Human	Mouse
Entrez	23522	54169
Ensembl	ENSG00000156650; ENSG00000281813	ENSMUSG00000021767
UniProt	Q8WYB5	Q8BRB7
RefSeq (mRNA)	NM_001256468; NM_001256469; NM_012330	NM_001205241; NM_017479
RefSeq (protein)	NP_001243397; NP_001243398; NP_036462	NP_001192170; NP_059507
Location (UCSC)	Chr 10: 74.82 – 75.03 Mb	Chr 14: 21.53 – 21.72 Mb
PubMed search
- Wikidata
View/Edit Human	View/Edit Mouse

K(lysine) acetyltransferase 6B (KAT6B) is an enzyme that in humans is encoded by the KAT6B gene.

== Interactions ==
KAT6B has been shown to interact with RUNX2.

== Clinical significance ==
It has been demonstrated that de novo mutations in the gene KAT6B causes Young–Simpson syndrome and genitopatellar syndrome.
