= 5'-acylphosphoadenosine hydrolase =

Class of enzymes

Identifiers
- EC no.: 3.6.1.20
- CAS no.: 37289-31-9

Databases
- BRENDA: enzyme data
- ExPASy: NiceZyme view
- KEGG: enzyme entry
- MetaCyc: metabolic pathway
- Rhea: reactions
- PDB structures: RCSB PDB PDBe PDBsum
- Gene Ontology: AmiGO / QuickGO
Search
- PMC: articles
- PubMed: articles
- NCBI: proteins

5'-acylphosphoadenosine hydrolase (EC 3.6.1.20) is an enzyme characterised from pig kidney mitochondria that catalyzes the hydrolysis of carboxylic acids linked to ademosine monophosphate (AMP):

5'-acylphosphoadenosine + H_{2}O $\rightleftharpoons$ AMP + a carboxylic acid

For example, the acetyl derivative of AMP is converted back to AMP:

5'-acetylphosphoadenosine
H_{2}O
adenosine monophosphate
+
acetic acid

This enzyme is a hydrolase, specifically one acting on acid anhydrides in phosphorus-containing anhydrides. The systematic name of this enzyme class is 5'-acylphosphoadenosine acylhydrolase. This enzyme is also called 5-phosphoadenosine hydrolase.
