= NuA4 histone acetyltransferase complex =

Identifiers
- Symbol: NuA4
- Pfam: PF09340
- InterPro: IPR015418
Available protein structures:
- PDB: PDB: 8esc 1myu 1n6t IPR015418 PF09340 (ECOD; PDBsum)
- AlphaFold: IPR015418; PF09340

The NuA4 histone acetyltransferase complex is a protein complex that has histone acetylase activity on chromatin, as well as ATPase, DNA helicase and structural DNA binding activities. The complex is thought to be involved in double-strand DNA break repair. Subunits of the human complex include HTATIP/TIP60, TRRAP, RUVBL1, RUVBL2, beta-actin and BAF53/ACTL6A. In yeast, the complex has 13 subunits, including the catalytic subunit Esa1 (homologous to human Tip60).

Post-translational acetylation of the histone H4 N-terminal tail in chromatin has been associated with several nuclear processes including transcription. Purification and characterization of a native multi-subunit complex (NuA4) from yeast that acetylates nucleosomal histone H4 have been reported. NuA4 has an apparent molecular mass of 1.3 MDa. All four conserved lysines of histone H4 can be acetylated by NuA4. The catalytic subunit of the complex has been identified as the product of ESA1, an essential gene required for cell cycle progression in yeast. Antibodies against Esa1p specifically immunoprecipitate NuA4 activity whereas the complex purified from a temperature-sensitive esa1 mutant loses its acetyltransferase activity at the restrictive temperature. Additionally, another subunit of the complex has been identified as the product of TRA1, an ATM-related essential gene homologous to human TRRAP, an essential cofactor for c-Myc- and E2F-mediated oncogenic transformation. Finally, the ability of NuA4 to stimulate GAL4–VP16-driven transcription from chromatin templates in vitro is also lost in the temperature-sensitive esa1 mutant. The function of the essential Esa1 protein as the HAT subunit of NuA4 and the presence of Tra1p, a putative [[transcription]] activator-interacting subunit, supports an essential link between nuclear H4 acetylation, transcriptional regulation and cell cycle control.
