= GTF3C5 =

Protein-coding gene in the species Homo sapiens

Identifiers
- Aliases: GTF3C5, TFIIIC63, TFIIICepsilon, TFiiiC2-63, general transcription factor IIIC subunit 5
- External IDs: OMIM: 604890; MGI: 1917489; GeneCards: GTF3C5

Gene location (Human)
Chr.	Chromosome 9 (human)
Band	9q34.13	Start	133,030,675 bp
Band	9q34.13	End	133,058,503 bp

Gene location (Mouse)
Chr.	Chromosome 2 (mouse)
Band	2|2 A3	Start	28,456,323 bp
Band	2|2 A3	End	28,473,763 bp
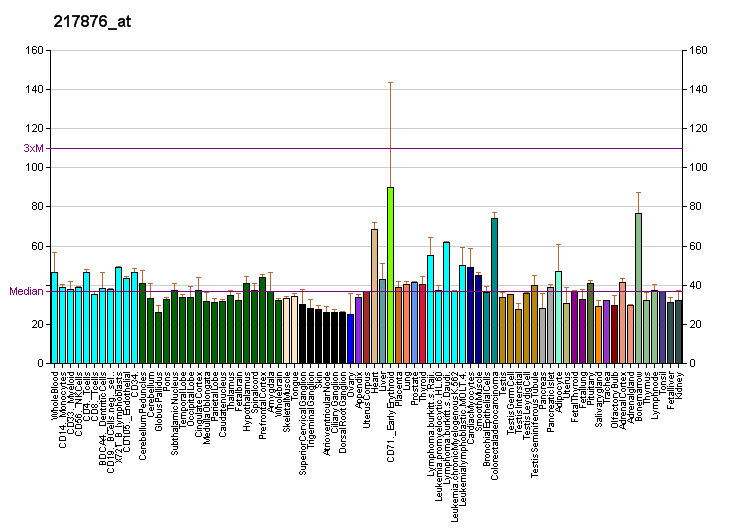
RNA expression pattern
Bgee	Human / Mouse (ortholog); Top expressed in: right hemisphere of cerebellum; right uterine tube; left ovary; apex of heart; anterior pituitary; right ovary; body of uterus; canal of the cervix; tibial nerve; ectocervix / Top expressed in: ventricular zone; tail of embryo; neural layer of retina; genital tubercle; epiblast; yolk sac; neural tube; internal carotid artery; external carotid artery; fetal liver hematopoietic progenitor cell; More reference expression data
BioGPS	More reference expression data
Gene ontology
Molecular function	DNA binding; protein binding; RNA polymerase III type 1 promoter sequence-specific DNA binding; RNA polymerase III type 2 promoter sequence-specific DNA binding; RNA polymerase III general transcription initiation factor activity
Cellular component	transcription factor TFIIIC complex; nucleus; nucleoplasm
Biological process	skeletal muscle cell differentiation; tRNA transcription by RNA polymerase III; 5S class rRNA transcription by RNA polymerase III; transcription, DNA-templated; transcription by RNA polymerase III; RNA polymerase III preinitiation complex assembly; transcription initiation from RNA polymerase III promoter
Sources:Amigo / QuickGO
Orthologs
Databases	NCBI: entry; OMA: entry
Species	Human	Mouse
Entrez	9328	70239
Ensembl	ENSG00000148308	ENSMUSG00000026816
UniProt	Q9Y5Q8	Q8R2T8
RefSeq (mRNA)	NM_001122823; NM_001286709; NM_012087	NM_001290484; NM_148928
RefSeq (protein)	NP_001116295; NP_001273638; NP_036219	NP_001277413; NP_683730
Location (UCSC)	Chr 9: 133.03 – 133.06 Mb	Chr 2: 28.46 – 28.47 Mb
PubMed search
- Wikidata
View/Edit Human	View/Edit Mouse

General transcription factor 3C polypeptide 5 is a protein that in humans is encoded by the GTF3C5 gene.

== Interactions ==
GTF3C5 has been shown to interact with GTF3C2 and GTF3C4.
