= GTF3C1 =

Protein-coding gene in the species Homo sapiens

Identifiers
- Aliases: GTF3C1, TFIIIC, TFIIIC220, TFIIICalpha, general transcription factor IIIC subunit 1
- External IDs: OMIM: 603246; MGI: 107887; GeneCards: GTF3C1

Gene location (Human)
| Chr. | Chromosome 16 (human) |
| Band | 16p12.1 | Start | 27,459,555 bp |
| Band | 16p12.1 | End | 27,549,913 bp |

Gene location (Mouse)
| Chr. | Chromosome 7 (mouse) |
| Band | 7 F3|7 69.01 cM | Start | 125,240,126 bp |
| Band | 7 F3|7 69.01 cM | End | 125,306,952 bp |
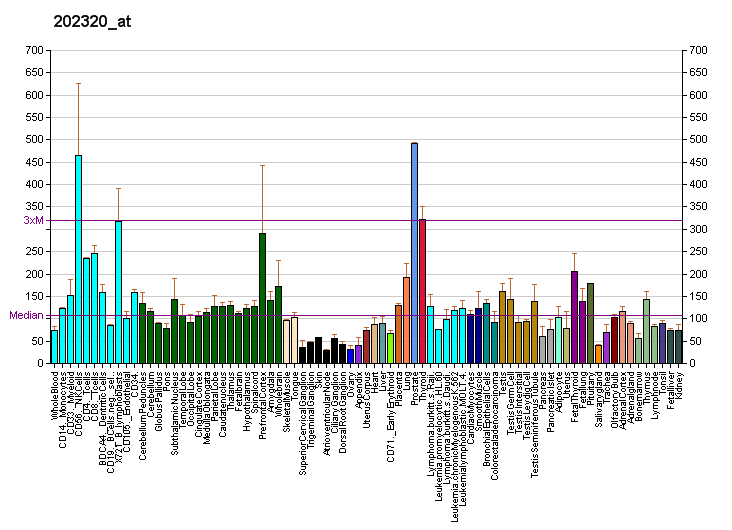

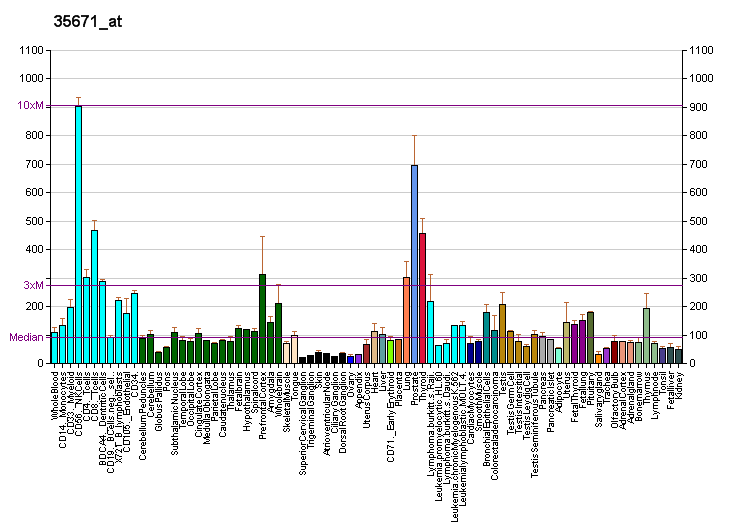
RNA expression pattern
| Bgee | Human / Mouse (ortholog); Top expressed in: anterior pituitary; skin of leg; skin of abdomen; sural nerve; right lobe of thyroid gland; ventricular zone; left lobe of thyroid gland; right hemisphere of cerebellum; apex of heart; stromal cell of endometrium / Top expressed in: tail of embryo; spermatocyte; genital tubercle; internal carotid artery; external carotid artery; dentate gyrus of hippocampal formation granule cell; neural layer of retina; superior frontal gyrus; ventricular zone; vestibular membrane of cochlear duct; More reference expression data |
| BioGPS | More reference expression data |
Gene ontology
| Molecular function | DNA binding; protein binding; RNA polymerase III general transcription initiation factor activity; RNA polymerase III type 1 promoter sequence-specific DNA binding; RNA polymerase III type 2 promoter sequence-specific DNA binding |
| Cellular component | transcription factor TFIIIC complex; nucleolus; membrane; nucleus; nucleoplasm; ribonucleoprotein complex |
| Biological process | tRNA transcription by RNA polymerase III; rRNA transcription; tRNA transcription; transcription, DNA-templated; transcription by RNA polymerase III; regulation of transcription by RNA polymerase III; transcription initiation from RNA polymerase III promoter; 5S class rRNA transcription by RNA polymerase III |
Sources:Amigo / QuickGO
Orthologs
| Databases | NCBI: entry; OMA: entry |
| Species | Human | Mouse |
| Entrez | 2975 | 233863 |
| Ensembl | ENSG00000077235 | ENSMUSG00000032777 |
| UniProt | Q12789 | Q8K284 |
| RefSeq (mRNA) | NM_001286242; NM_001520 | NM_207239 |
| RefSeq (protein) | NP_001273171; NP_001511 | NP_997122 |
| Location (UCSC) | Chr 16: 27.46 – 27.55 Mb | Chr 7: 125.24 – 125.31 Mb |
| PubMed search |
- Wikidata
| View/Edit Human | View/Edit Mouse |

General transcription factor 3C polypeptide 1 is a protein that in humans is encoded by the GTF3C1 gene.

== Interactions ==
GTF3C1 has been shown to interact with GTF3C4.
