= NatA acetyltransferase =

NatA acetyltransferase(N^{α} acetyltransferase), is an enzyme that serves to catalyze the addition of acetyl groups to various proteins emerging from the ribosome. Upon translation, the NatA binds to the ribosome and then "stretches" to the front end of the forming, or nascent, polypeptide, where it adds this acetyl group. This acetyl group is added to the front end, or N-terminus of the new protein.

Forty percent of all proteins in the yeast proteome are thought to be N-terminally acetylated, with a corresponding figure of 90% in mammalian proteins.

To be specific, NatA is the main N{alpha}-terminal acetyltransferase in the yeast cytosol, responsible for the acetylation of proteins at locations in which L-serine, L-alanine, L-threonine, or glycine are present.

NatA Acetyltransferase is not a single protein but a complex of three subunits.

== Sup35p acetylation ==
In Saccharomyces cerevisiae NatA acetyltransferase interacts with the Sup35p protein. It is involved in the reaction of the [PSI+], converting the [psi-] to its own conformation. Thus, [PSI+] strains deficient in NatA Acetyltransferase have been found to have an altered interaction between Sup35p[PSI+] and nascent Sup35p. This interaction at the post-translational level still produces a prion with classical beta sheets, but this version of the interaction does not take away the function of this third release factor. Thus, stop codons are translated reliably in [PSI+] strains lacking NatA Acetyltransferase.

== Subunits in yeast ==
- Naa10 (formerly Nat1p) – 27kDA, has catalytic properties which acetylate the nascent polypeptide.
- Naa15 (formerly Ard1p) – 98kDa, functions to bind to anchor onto the ribosome.
- Naa50 (formerly Nat5p) – Newly discovered, unknown function.

Yeast cells lacking Naa15 and Naa10 show a reduced sporulation efficiency, failure to enter G_{0} phase under specific conditions, defect in silencing of the silent mating-type loci, and decreased survival after heat shock. However, strains lacking Naa50 do not show any obvious difference to the phenotype.

== Comparisons ==
Natp requires longer nascent polypeptide chains to function catalystically than NAC (nascent polypeptide-associated complex) and Hsp70 homologue Ssb1/2p.
