= Acetyltransferase =

Class of enzymes

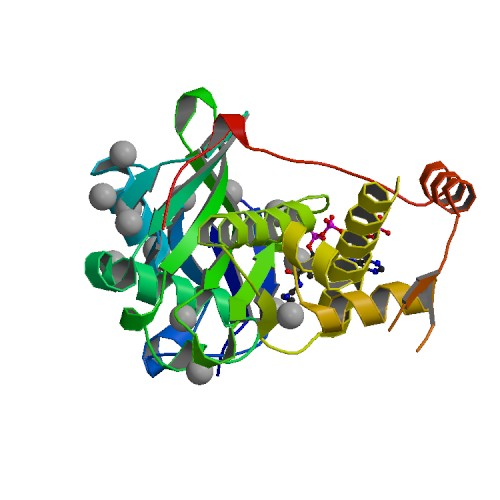
3D structure of histone acetyltransferase

An acetyltransferase (also referred to as a transacetylase) is any of a class of transferase enzymes that transfers an acetyl group in a reaction called acetylation. In biological organisms, post-translational modification of a protein via acetylation can profoundly transform its functionality by altering various properties like hydrophobicity, solubility, and surface attributes. These alterations have the potential to influence the protein's conformation and its interactions with substrates, cofactors, and other macromolecules.

== Types of acetyltransferases ==
Table 1: Types of acetyltransferases found in humans
Acetyltransferases	Substrate	Gene	Chromosome locus in humans	Gene group	Abbreviation
Histone acetyltransferase	Lysine residues of histones	HAT1	2q31.1	Lysine acetyltransferases	HAT
Choline acetyltransferase	Choline	CHAT	10q11.23	NA	ChAT
Serotonin N-acetyltransferase	Serotonin	AANAT	17q25.1	GCN5-related N-acetyltransferases	AANAT
NatA acetyltransferase	N-terminus of various proteins as they emerge from the ribosome	NAA15	4q31.1	Armadillo-like helical domain containing N-alpha-acetyltransferase subunits	NatA
NatB acetyltransferase	Peptides starting with Met-Asp/Glu/Asn/Gln	NAA25	12q24.13	N-alpha-acetyltransferase subunits of microRNA protein-coding host genes	NatB

Additional examples of acetyltransferases found in nature include:

- Chloramphenicol acetyltransferase

== Structure ==
The predicted three-dimensional structures of histone, choline, and serotonin acetyltransferases are shown below. As with all enzymes, the structures of acetyltransferases are essential for interactions between them and their substrates; alterations to the structures of these enzymes often result in a loss of enzymatic activity.

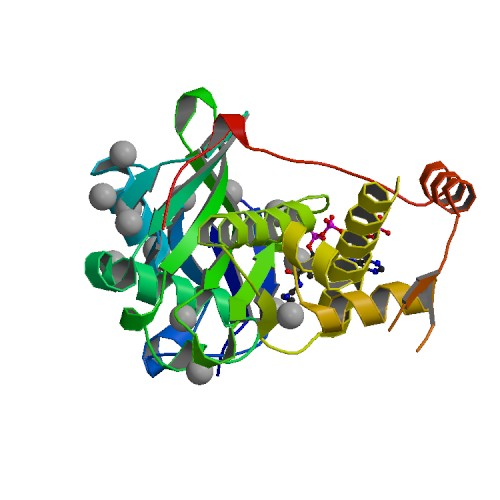
3D structure of histone acetyltransferase

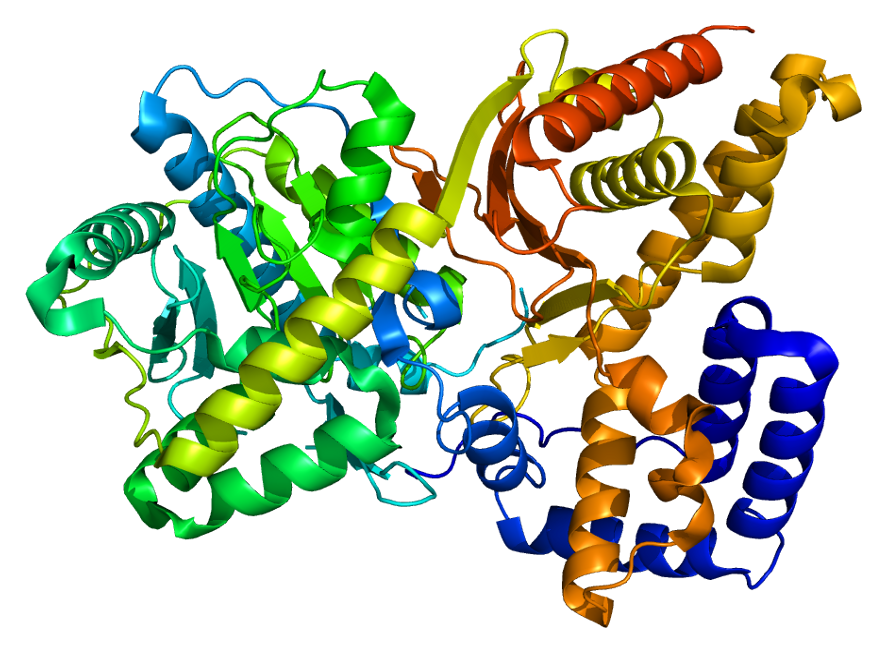
3D Structure of choline acetyltransferase

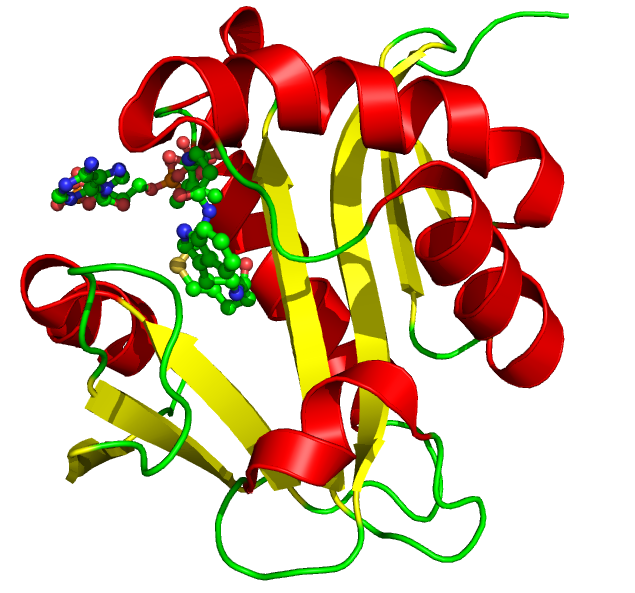
3D structure of serotonin N-acetyltransferase

== See also ==
- Acyltransferase
- Acetylation
