= GTF3C2 =

Protein-coding gene in the species Homo sapiens

Identifiers
- Aliases: GTF3C2, TFIIIC-BETA, TFIIIC110, general transcription factor IIIC subunit 2
- External IDs: OMIM: 604883; MGI: 1919002; GeneCards: GTF3C2

Gene location (Human)
Chr.	Chromosome 2 (human)
Band	2p23.3	Start	27,325,849 bp
Band	2p23.3	End	27,357,034 bp

Gene location (Mouse)
Chr.	Chromosome 5 (mouse)
Band	5|5 B1	Start	31,313,349 bp
Band	5|5 B1	End	31,337,488 bp
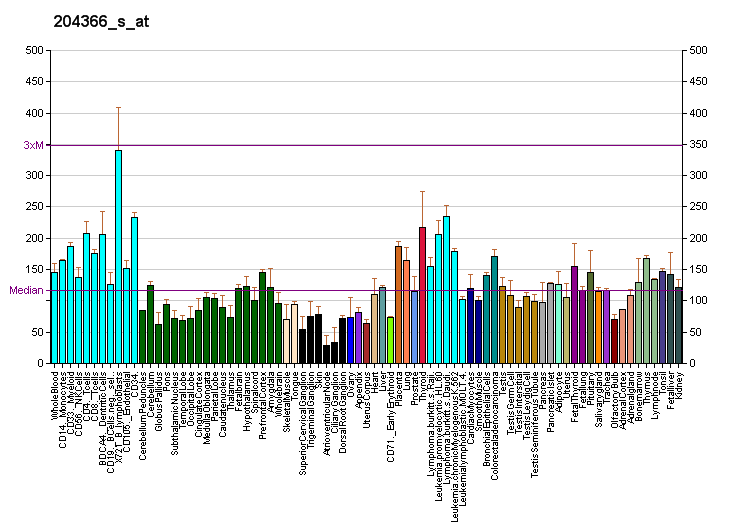

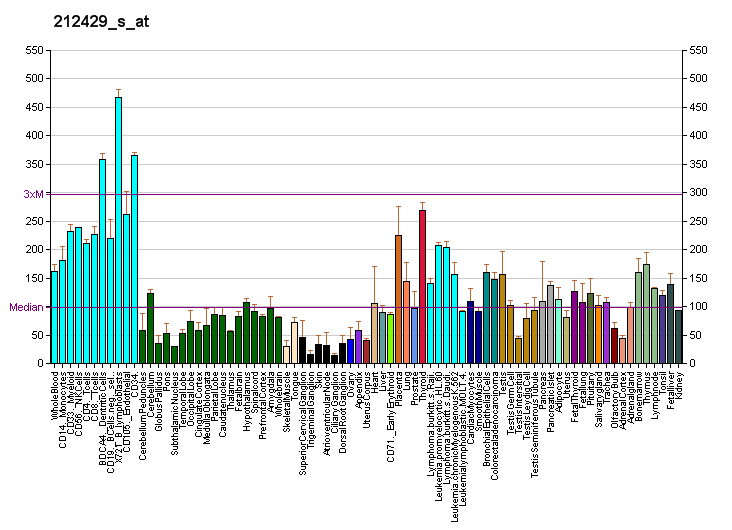

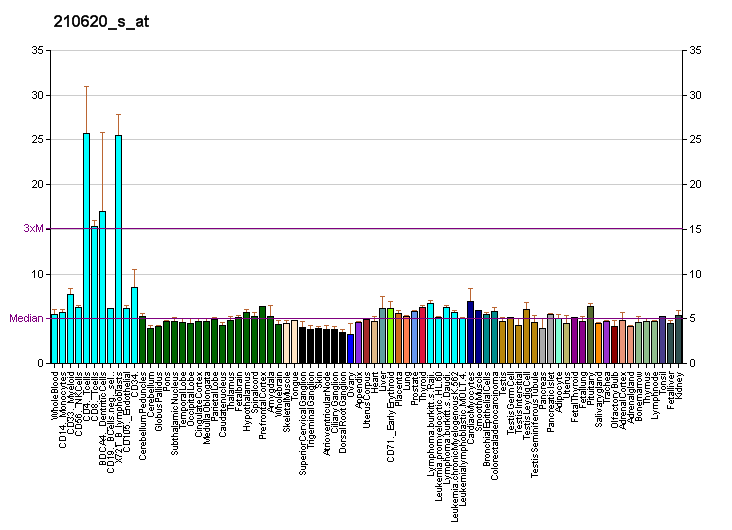
RNA expression pattern
Bgee	Human / Mouse (ortholog); Top expressed in: skin of leg; right lobe of thyroid gland; right uterine tube; skin of abdomen; left lobe of thyroid gland; minor salivary glands; body of pancreas; gastric mucosa; mucosa of transverse colon; granulocyte / Top expressed in: tail of embryo; genital tubercle; neural layer of retina; yolk sac; internal carotid artery; external carotid artery; epiblast; secondary oocyte; ventricular zone; zygote; More reference expression data
BioGPS	More reference expression data
Gene ontology
Molecular function	DNA binding; protein binding; RNA polymerase III general transcription initiation factor activity
Cellular component	transcription factor TFIIIC complex; nucleus; nucleoplasm
Biological process	tRNA transcription by RNA polymerase III; 5S class rRNA transcription by RNA polymerase III; transcription, DNA-templated; transcription by RNA polymerase III
Sources:Amigo / QuickGO
Orthologs
Databases	NCBI: entry; OMA: entry
Species	Human	Mouse
Entrez	2976	71752
Ensembl	ENSG00000115207	ENSMUSG00000106864
UniProt	Q8WUA4	Q8BL74
RefSeq (mRNA)	NM_001035521; NM_001521; NM_001318909; NM_001388380	NM_027901
RefSeq (protein)	NP_001030598; NP_001305838; NP_001512	NP_082177
Location (UCSC)	Chr 2: 27.33 – 27.36 Mb	Chr 5: 31.31 – 31.34 Mb
PubMed search
- Wikidata
View/Edit Human	View/Edit Mouse

General transcription factor 3C polypeptide 2 is a protein that in humans is encoded by the GTF3C2 gene.

== Interactions ==
GTF3C2 has been shown to interact with GTF3C4 and GTF3C5.
