= NatB acetyltransferase =

Enzyme

NatB acetyltransferase is an enzyme in the Saccharomyces cerevisiae that functions to catalyze the dehydration synthesis of the addition of an acetyl group onto a nascent polypeptide. A list of 18 proteins are known to be acetylated by this enzyme. The subclasses of proteins with abundances of the amino acids aspartic acid, methionine specifically are acetylated.
