= Ribophorin =

Ribophorins are dome shaped transmembrane glycoproteins which are located in the membrane of the rough endoplasmic reticulum, but are absent in the membrane of the smooth endoplasmic reticulum. There are two types of ribophorines: ribophorin I and II. These act in the protein complex oligosaccharyltransferase (OST) as two different subunits of the named complex. Ribophorin I and II are only present in eukaryote cells.

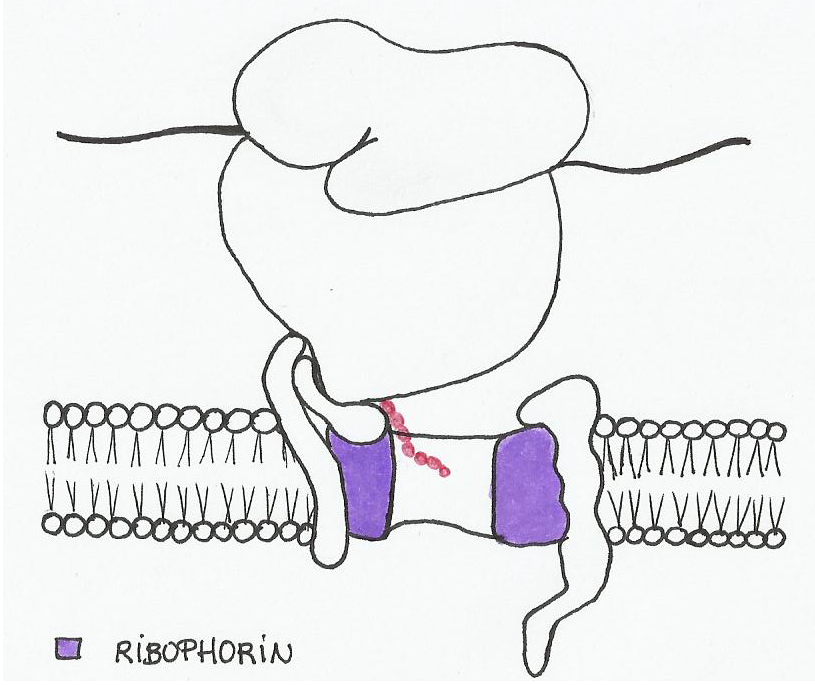
Ribophorin is a subunit of oligosaccharide transferase in the RER

Both types of ribophorins develop a key role in the binding of ribosomes to the rough endoplasmic reticulum as well as in the co-translational processes that depend on this interaction. The content of ribophorin of the rough endoplasmic reticulum is equal to the stoichiometric number of ribosomal units. Therefore, this suggests the great importance, abundance and good preservation of these proteins in the reticulum. Consequently, defects in the genes that encode these proteins may cause congenital disorders and devastating consequences; ribophorin I and II are encoded by the genes RPN1 and RPN2 respectively.

The ribophorins are soluble in non-ionic detergents such as Triton X-100.

== Structure ==
There two types of ribophorin: ribophorin I and ribophorin II; because of that, each one its own characteristics, despite the fact that both ribophorins have some common characteristics. This way, ribophorin I has a different structure in comparison to ribophorin II.

=== Ribophorin I ===
This subunit of the oligosaccharyltransferase (OST) is formed by 1821 pairs of bases, which is about 607 aminoacids. Its molecular weight is 68550,8 daltons.

When anchored to the membrane, 75% of its amino acids are at the lumen of the endoplasmic reticulum or in it. Its signal sequence, eliminated when the protein has matured, is formed by 23 amino acids and has a negative charge, which is very unusual. The rest of the amino acids of the mature protein (584 AA) are distributed in this way: from AA 1 to 415 they are located at the lumen of the ER, from 416 to 434 are anchored at the membrane of the organelle, and the others in the cytoplasm.

=== Ribophorin II ===
The other subunit of the OST is formed by 1896 pairs of bases, which is equivalent to 632 amino acids. Its molecular weight is about 69283’4 daltons. In ribophorin II, the 90% of the amino acids are located at the membrane or at the lumen of the endoplasmic reticulum. As the ribophorin I, it also shows a signal sequence, but this one is formed by 22 AA, with a negative charge too.

The distribution of the rest is as follows: from AA 1 to 516 are at the lumen, from 517 to 539 at the membrane (as an anchorage) and the last 70 at the cytoplasm. In this case the asparagine which is glycosylated is the number 84 AA. The ribophorin II is completely resistant to a great variety of proteases.

== Location ==
Ribophorins are only found in mammal cells, where they are positioned in the membrane of the rough endoplasmic reticulum. They interact with the ribosome during protein translocation into the ER.

Both ribophorin I and II possess a type I membrane topology with the bulk of their polypeptide chains directed towards the ER-lumen and they are part of the mammalian protein complex OST; this complex affects the cotranslational N-glycosylation of newly synthesized polypeptides, and is composed by four RER specific membrane proteins, which are the ribophorins (I and II), the OST48 and the Dadl. In order to form the OST complex, there are specific interactions between the proteins; because of that, the lumen domains of ribophorin I and II interact with the lumen domain of OST48. Nevertheless, there is not a direct interaction between both ribophorins.

As they are transmembrane proteins, ribophorins cross the ER membrane and, so that, the protein has a cytoplasmic, a transmembrane and a lumen domain. In the case of the ribophorin II, the transmembrane and the cytoplasmic domains are the ones that have the retention function on the ER; but on the other hand, the lumen domain is the one with the retention function for ribophorin I.

Ribophorin I resides in the ER membrane with a single spanning sequence from amino acids 416 to 434, having a cytoplasmic C terminus of 150 amino acids and a luminal N-terminal domain consisting of 415 residues. Ribophotin II is disposed on a similar way in the ER membrane, but now the membrane-spanning domain is located at residues 517-539 and asparagine residues 544 and 547 would be disposed at the cytoplasm leaving only Asn84 as the putative site for oligosaccharide addition; the cytoplasmic domain will have a maximum length of 70 residues.

Ribophorins possess signal sequences that localize them preferentially to the ER membrane.

== Function ==
Ribophorins I and II, transmembrane glycoprotein of the rough endoplasmic reticulum, intervene in the union of the ribosomes (they fix the large subunit, 60S, of the ribosome) to the RE membrane, and they play an important role in the co-translational translocation process which depends on this union, as the com insertion of the nascent polypeptide to the membrane or their transference to the lumen of the cistern; this is the translocation of proteins generated by polyribosomes.

Ribophorin I usually interacts with those proteins that have a wrong folding; otherwise, this protein does not interact with native state proteins. This suggests that ribophorin I may work as a chaperone that recognizes the proteins with a wrong folding. Moreover, this ribophorin can regulate the delivery of precursor proteins to the oligosaccharyltransferase (main enzyme of the N-glycosylation for proteins), through the capture of substrates and taking them to the catalytic center. So that, ribophorin I can keep those possible substrates in the proximity of the catalytic subunit of the enzyme; this way, the efficiency of the N-glycosylation reaction will improve during their biogenesis in the ER. But ribophorin I only changes drastically the N-glycosylation of determined substrates, as it is apparently dispensable in the same process with other substrates. When ribophorin is not essential, these precursors have shortcut to the catalytic center of the oligosaccharyltransferase or their presence depends on the rest of the non-catalytic subunits in the complex. It shows the specificity of ribophorin I for determined substrates; so that, this protein will regulate selectively the delivery of substrates to the catalytic center of the oligosaccharyltransferase complex.

Although ribophorin II is still a protein quite unknown, it has been discovered that this ribophorin is part of an N-oligosaccharyltransferase complex that links high mannose oligosaccharides to asparagine residues found in the Asn-X-Ser/Thr consensus motif of nascent polypeptide chains. Moreover, this protein takes part in the identification of retention signals of other proteins.

There is not much information about ribophorin II because this subunit of the complex hasn’t been as investigated as ribophorin I.

== Synthesis of the ribophorins ==
Protein synthesis of ribophorins is carried out in the cytoplasm. Ribophorin I is encoded by the RPN1 gene, whereas ribophorin II is encoded by the RPN2 gene. Moreover, each gene encodes a signal sequence to indicate the ribophorin cellular localization. In humans, the sequence is formed by 23 amino acids in ribophorin I; and 22 amino acids in ribophorin II.

In the chromosome, the genes are found in a specific locus. In humans, RPN1 is located at 3q21.3 (in chromosome 3) and RPN2 is found at the locus 20q12-q13.1 (in chromosome 20). In total, ribophorin I and II are composed by 607 and 632 amino acids, respectively.

== See also ==
- Endoplasmatic reticulum
