= RPN1 =

Protein-coding gene in the species Homo sapiens

Identifiers
- Aliases: RPN1, OST1, RBPH1, ribophorin I
- External IDs: OMIM: 180470; MGI: 98084; GeneCards: RPN1

Gene location (Human)
Chr.	Chromosome 3 (human)
Band	3q21.3	Start	128,619,969 bp
Band	3q21.3	End	128,681,075 bp

Gene location (Mouse)
Chr.	Chromosome 6 (mouse)
Band	6 D1|6 39.13 cM	Start	88,061,464 bp
Band	6 D1|6 39.13 cM	End	88,082,286 bp
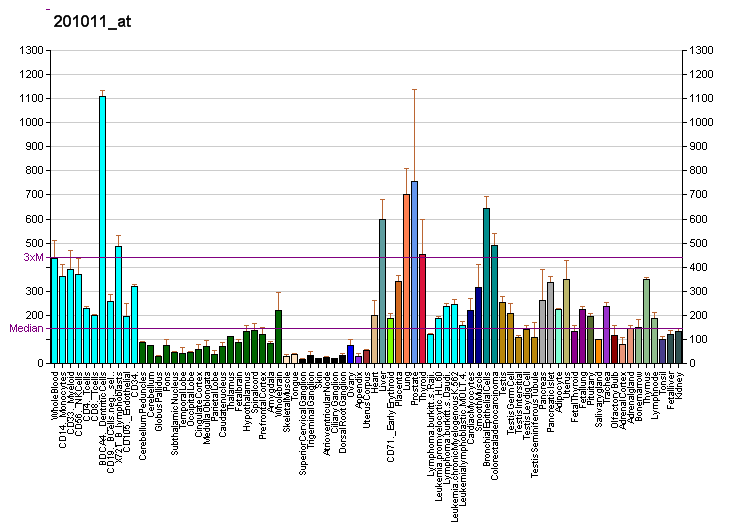
RNA expression pattern
Bgee	Human / Mouse (ortholog); Top expressed in: stromal cell of endometrium; corpus epididymis; rectum; upper lobe of left lung; olfactory zone of nasal mucosa; right lung; right lobe of thyroid gland; islet of Langerhans; gallbladder; body of pancreas / Top expressed in: medullary collecting duct; renal corpuscle; seminal vesicula; lacrimal gland; condyle; fossa; supraoptic nucleus; crypt of lieberkuhn of small intestine; spermatocyte; secretory cell; More reference expression data
BioGPS	More reference expression data
Gene ontology
Molecular function	protein binding; dolichyl-diphosphooligosaccharide-protein glycotransferase activity; RNA binding
Cellular component	melanosome; integral component of membrane; oligosaccharyltransferase complex; rough endoplasmic reticulum; endoplasmic reticulum membrane; membrane; extracellular matrix; endoplasmic reticulum; cytosol
Biological process	protein glycosylation; protein N-linked glycosylation via asparagine
Sources:Amigo / QuickGO
Orthologs
Databases	NCBI: entry; OMA: entry
Species	Human	Mouse
Entrez	6184	103963
Ensembl	ENSG00000163902	ENSMUSG00000030062
UniProt	P04843	Q91YQ5
RefSeq (mRNA)	NM_002950	NM_133933
RefSeq (protein)	NP_002941	NP_598694
Location (UCSC)	Chr 3: 128.62 – 128.68 Mb	Chr 6: 88.06 – 88.08 Mb
PubMed search
- Wikidata
View/Edit Human	View/Edit Mouse

Dolichyl-diphosphooligosaccharide—protein glycosyltransferase subunit 1 is an enzyme that in humans is encoded by the RPN1 gene.

This gene encodes a type I integral ribophorin membrane protein found only in the rough endoplasmic reticulum. The encoded protein is part of an N-oligosaccharyl transferase complex that links high mannose oligosaccharides to asparagine residues found in the Asn-X-Ser/Thr consensus motif of nascent polypeptide chains. This protein should not be confused with RPN1 of yeast, Drosophila, and C. elegans, which forms part of the regulatory subunit of the 26S proteasome and may mediate binding of ubiquitin-like domains to this proteasome. The human version of this proteasome subunit is PSMD2.
