= GTF3C4 =

Protein-coding gene in the species Homo sapiens

Identifiers
- Aliases: GTF3C4, KAT12, TFIII90, TFIIIC290, TFIIIC90, TFIIICDELTA, TF3C-delta, general transcription factor IIIC subunit 4
- External IDs: OMIM: 604892; MGI: 2138937; GeneCards: GTF3C4
Enzyme activity
EC #	BRENDA	ExPASy	KEGG	MetaCyc
2.3.1.48	↗	↗	↗	↗

Gene location (Human)
Chr.	Chromosome 9 (human)
Band	9q34.13	Start	132,670,035 bp
Band	9q34.13	End	132,694,953 bp

Gene location (Mouse)
Chr.	Chromosome 2 (mouse)
Band	2|2 A3	Start	28,822,299 bp
Band	2|2 A3	End	28,840,360 bp
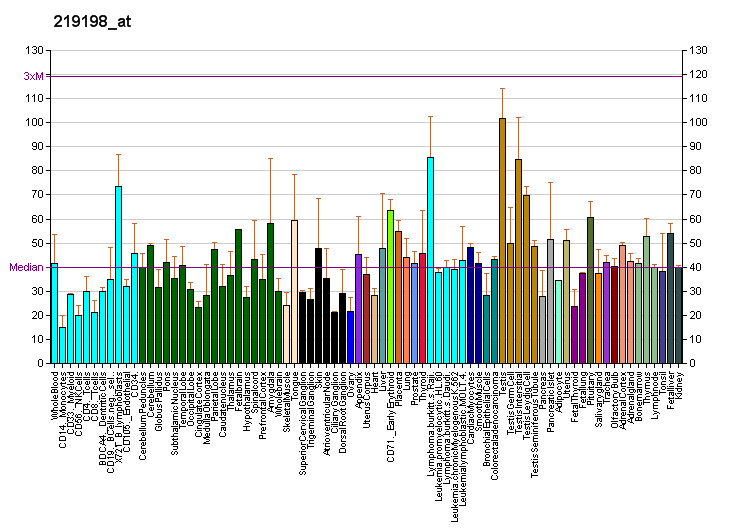
RNA expression pattern
Bgee	Human / Mouse (ortholog); Top expressed in: gonad; ventricular zone; gingival epithelium; islet of Langerhans; ganglionic eminence; testicle; hair follicle; stromal cell of endometrium; middle temporal gyrus; skin of thigh / Top expressed in: ureter; medullary collecting duct; saccule; otic placode; vas deferens; renal corpuscle; otic vesicle; fossa; condyle; vestibular sensory epithelium; More reference expression data
BioGPS	More reference expression data
Gene ontology
Molecular function	histone acetyltransferase activity; transferase activity; DNA binding; enzyme activator activity; acyltransferase activity; protein binding
Cellular component	transcription factor TFIIIC complex; nucleoplasm; nucleus; mitochondrion
Biological process	tRNA transcription by RNA polymerase III; 5S class rRNA transcription by RNA polymerase III; transcription initiation from RNA polymerase III promoter; transcription, DNA-templated; positive regulation of catalytic activity; transcription by RNA polymerase III; histone acetylation
Sources:Amigo / QuickGO
Orthologs
Databases	NCBI: entry; OMA: entry
Species	Human	Mouse
Entrez	9329	269252
Ensembl	ENSG00000125484	ENSMUSG00000035666
UniProt	Q9UKN8	Q8BMQ2
RefSeq (mRNA)	NM_012204	NM_001166033; NM_172977
RefSeq (protein)	NP_036336	NP_001159505; NP_766565
Location (UCSC)	Chr 9: 132.67 – 132.69 Mb	Chr 2: 28.82 – 28.84 Mb
PubMed search
- Wikidata
View/Edit Human	View/Edit Mouse

General transcription factor 3C polypeptide 4 is a protein that in humans is encoded by the GTF3C4 gene.

== Interactions ==
GTF3C4 has been shown to interact with GTF3C2, GTF3C1, POLR3C and GTF3C5.
