= Young–Simpson syndrome =

- Other names: Hypothyroidism-dysmorphism-postaxial polydactyly-intellectual disability syndrome, Say-Barber-Biesecker-Young-Simpson syndrome
- This condition is inherited via autosomal dominant manner
- Frequency: 0.0001%

Young–Simpson syndrome (YSS) is a rare congenital disorder with symptoms including hypothyroidism, heart defects, facial dysmorphism, cryptorchidism in males, hypotonia, intellectual disability, and postnatal growth retardation.

Other symptoms include transient hypothyroidism, macular degeneration, and torticollis. The condition was discovered in 1987 and the name arose from the individuals who first reported the syndrome. An individual with YSS has been identified with having symptoms to a similar syndrome known as Ohdo Blepharophimosis syndrome, showing that it is quite difficult to diagnose the correct condition based on the symptoms present. Some doctors therefore consider these syndromes to be the same.

== Signs and symptoms ==
Ohdo syndrome, SBBYSS variant, typically occurs early in life, with most diagnoses occurring at birth or during infancy. Patients with SBBYSS variant of Ohdo syndrome are characterized with hyperthyroidism, heart defects, facial dysmorphism, hypotonia, intellectual disability, and postnatal growth retardation.

=== Skeletal ===
Underdeveloped patellae (kneecaps) are the most common skeletal symptom associated with the syndrome. Additionally, abnormally long thumbs and great toes as well as dental abnormalities are also common among patients. Joint stiffness involving the hips, knees, and ankles is common which impairs movement among patients. Polydactyly, camptodactyly, clinodactyly, brachydactyly, syndactyly, club feet, and abnormalities of the spine and/or ribs may affect patients with the syndrome.

=== Facial ===
Facial signs and symptoms are most distinguishable among patients of this syndrome. Patients with Ohdo syndrome, SBBYS syndrome are characterized to have non-expressive mask-life faces. Additionally, patients may have features such as broad nasal bridges, nose with rounded top, narrowing of the eye opening, and prominent cheeks. Patients with the syndrome may also have abnormalities of the lacrimal glands and may be born with an opening in the roof of the mouth (cleft palate).

=== Clinical ===
Heart malformations, ocular anomalies, and bilateral mixed hearing loss are often present in patients. Genital malformations such as cryptorchidism, hypospadias, clitoromegaly, and hypoplasia are common. In a smaller number of cases, thyroid agenesis, hypothyroidism, intestinal malrotation, and respiratory difficulties are present.

== Genetics ==
Say-Barber-Biesecker-Young-Simpson syndrome, a variant of Ohdo syndrome is primarily inherited through autosomal dominance. Young-Simpson syndrome is associated with the mutation of the KAT6B gene on chromosome 10q22. This is caused by a heterozygous mutation in the KAT6B gene.

The KAT6B gene possesses the instructions to make the enzyme histone acetyltransferase. This enzyme is known to modify histones, which are proteins that can bind to DNA. Histones shape chromosomes, making certain areas of genes active or inactive. Additionally, acetyltransferase can add acetyl groups to histones which also controls the activity of certain genes. In Young Simpson syndrome, a mutation of the KAT6B gene and shortage of enzyme acetyltransferase impairs gene regulation during early development, for example, nervous system and skeleton development. There is little known about how the specific changes within the KAT6B lead to specific features within the disease or the severity of the disease.

== Diagnosis ==
Source Diagnosis of Ohdo syndrome, SBBYS variant, is done through clinical examination, brain imaging, and molecular studies. The diagnosis of Ohdo Syndrome, SBBYS variant is based on:

- Mask-like faces
- Blepharophimosis
- Ptosis
- Global development delay/impaired intellectual development
- Dental abnormalities
- Congenital heart defects
- Genital abnormalities
- Hypotonia
- Patellar hypoplasia/agenesis

=== Differential diagnosis ===
Diagnosis of Ohdo syndrome, SBBYS variant, is often confused with genitopatellar syndrome due to overlapping signs and symptoms. However, mask-like faces, blepharophimosis, and ptosis are symptoms that allow Ohdo syndrome, SBBYS variant, to be distinguished from genitopatellar syndrome. Nevertheless, there is difficulty in distinguishing between the two genetic disorders.

=== History ===
Ohdo syndrome, SBBYS variant was previously diagnosed through clinical examination. Symptoms such as intellectual disability, facial dysmorphism, thyroid dysfunction, impaired intellectual development, etc. Additionally, tests such as diffusion tensor magnetic resonance imaging (MRI) and tractography of the brain were used to diagnose the disorder.

== Management ==
Source There are currently no known treatments for Ohdo syndrome, SBBYS variant. Management of the syndrome includes regular follow-up based on current complications of the patient and requires specific examinations (pediatric, cardiological, audiometric, orthopedic, neuropsychiatric, ophthalmological, and genetic). Additionally, occupational, physical, speech, feeding, and educational therapy must be conducted depending on the needs of the patient.

== Epidemiology ==
Cases of SBBYS are not caused by the parents affected genes however, they are affected by their own mutation on the KAT6B gene. If a doctor does suspect that a child or patient will suffer from SBBYS they are able to diagnose the individual through genetic testing. SBBYS has no cure and is hard to treat because of how hard it is to diagnose. SBBYS occurs in less than 1 in a million kids.
