= CGAS–STING cytosolic DNA sensing pathway =

Component of the innate immune system

The cGAS–STING pathway (cyclic GMP-AMP synthase - stimulator of interferon genes) is a component of the innate immune system that functions to detect the presence of cytosolic DNA and, in response, trigger expression of inflammatory genes that can lead to senescence or to the activation of defense mechanisms. DNA is normally found in the nucleus of the cell. Localization of DNA to the cytosol is associated with tumorigenesis, viral infection, and invasion by some intracellular bacteria. The cGAS – STING pathway acts to detect cytosolic DNA and induce an immune response.

Upon binding DNA, the protein cyclic GMP-AMP synthase (cGAS) triggers reaction of GTP and ATP to form cyclic GMP-AMP (cGAMP). cGAMP binds to Stimulator of Interferon Genes (STING) which triggers phosphorylation of IRF3 via TBK1. IRF3 can then go to the nucleus to trigger transcription of inflammatory genes. This pathway plays a critical role in mediating immune defense against double-stranded DNA viruses.

The innate immune system relies on germline-encoded pattern recognition receptors (PRRs) to recognize distinct pathogen-associated molecular patterns (PAMPs). Upon recognition of a PAMP, PRRs generate signal cascades leading to transcription of genes associated with the immune response. Because all pathogens utilize nucleic acid to propagate, DNA and RNA can be recognized by PRRs to trigger immune activation. In normal cells, DNA is confined to the nucleus or mitochondria. The presence of DNA in the cytosol is indicative of cellular damage or infection and leads to activation of genes associated with the immune response. One way cytosolic DNA is sensed is via the cGAS/STING pathway, specifically by the cyclic-GMP-AMP synthase (cGAS). Upon DNA recognition, cGAS dimerizes and stimulates the formation of cyclic-GMP-AMP (cGAMP). cGAMP then binds directly to stimulator of interferon genes (STING) which triggers phosphorylation/activation of the transcription factor IRF3 via TBK1. IRF3 is able to enter the nucleus to promote transcription of inflammatory genes, such as IFN-β.

== Cyclic GMP-AMP synthase (cGAS) ==
=== Structure ===
cGAS is a 522-amino-acid protein and a member of the nucleotidyltransferase family. N-terminal residues 1–212 are necessary to bind dsDNA. This region may contain two different DNA binding domains. C-terminal residues 213-522 contain part of the nucleotidyltransferase (NTase) motif and a Mab21 domain and are highly conserved in cGAS from zebrafish to humans. These regions are necessary to form the catalytic pocket for the cGAS substrates: GTP and ATP, and to perform the necessary cyclization reaction.

=== Function ===
cGAS is found at the plasma membrane and is responsible for detecting cytosolic double stranded DNA, normally found in the cell nucleus, in order to stimulate production of IFN-β. cGAS is also found in the nucleus where tight tethering to chromatin prevents its activation by self-DNA. Upon directly binding cytosolic DNA, cGAS forms dimers to catalyze production of 2'3'-cGAMP from ATP and GTP. cGAMP then acts a second messenger, binding to STING, to trigger activation of the transcription factor IRF3. IRF3 leads to transcription of type-1 IFN-β. cGAS is unable to produce 2'3'-cGAMP in the presence of RNA.

=== Discovery ===
Prior to the discovery of cGAS, it was known that interferon beta was produced in the presence of cytosolic dsDNA and that STING-deficient cells were unable to produce interferon in the presence of dsDNA. Through biochemical fractionation of cell extracts and quantitative mass spectrometry, Sun, et al. identified cGAS as the DNA-sensing protein able to trigger interferon beta by synthesizing the second messenger, 2'3'-cGAMP. This activity is dependent on cytosolic DNA.

=== Enzymatic activity ===
cGAS catalyzes formation of cGAMP in the presence of dsDNA. cGAS directly binds dsDNA via positively charged amino acid residues interacting with the negatively charged DNA phosphate backbone. Mutations in the positively charged residues completely abrogate DNA binding and subsequent interferon production through STING. Upon binding dsDNA, cGAS dimerizes and undergoes conformational changes that open up a catalytic nucleotide binding pocket, allowing GTP and ATP to enter. Here they are stabilized through base stacking, hydrogen bonds, and divalent cations in order to catalyze phosphodiester bond formation to produce the cyclic dinucleotide cGAMP.

== Cyclic GMP-AMP (cGAMP) ==
=== Structure ===
Cyclic GMP-AMP (cGAMP) is a cyclic dinucleotide (CDN) and the first to be found in metazoans. Other CDNs (c-di-GMP and c-di-AMP) are commonly found in bacteria, archaea, and protozoa. As the name suggests, cGAMP is cyclic molecule composed of one Adenine monophosphate (AMP) and one Guanine monophosphate (GMP) connected by two phosphodiester bonds. However, cGAMP differs from other CDNs in that it contains a unique phosphodiester bonds between the 2' OH of GMP and the 5' phosphate of AMP. The other bond is between the 3' OH of AMP and the 5' phosphate of GMP. The unique 2'-5' phosphodiester bond may be advantageous because it is less susceptible to degradation caused by 3'-5' phosphodiesterases. Other advantages of the unique 2'-5' linkage may be that cGAMP is able to bind multiple allelic variants of STING found in the human population, while other CDNs, composed of only 3'-5' linkages, are not.

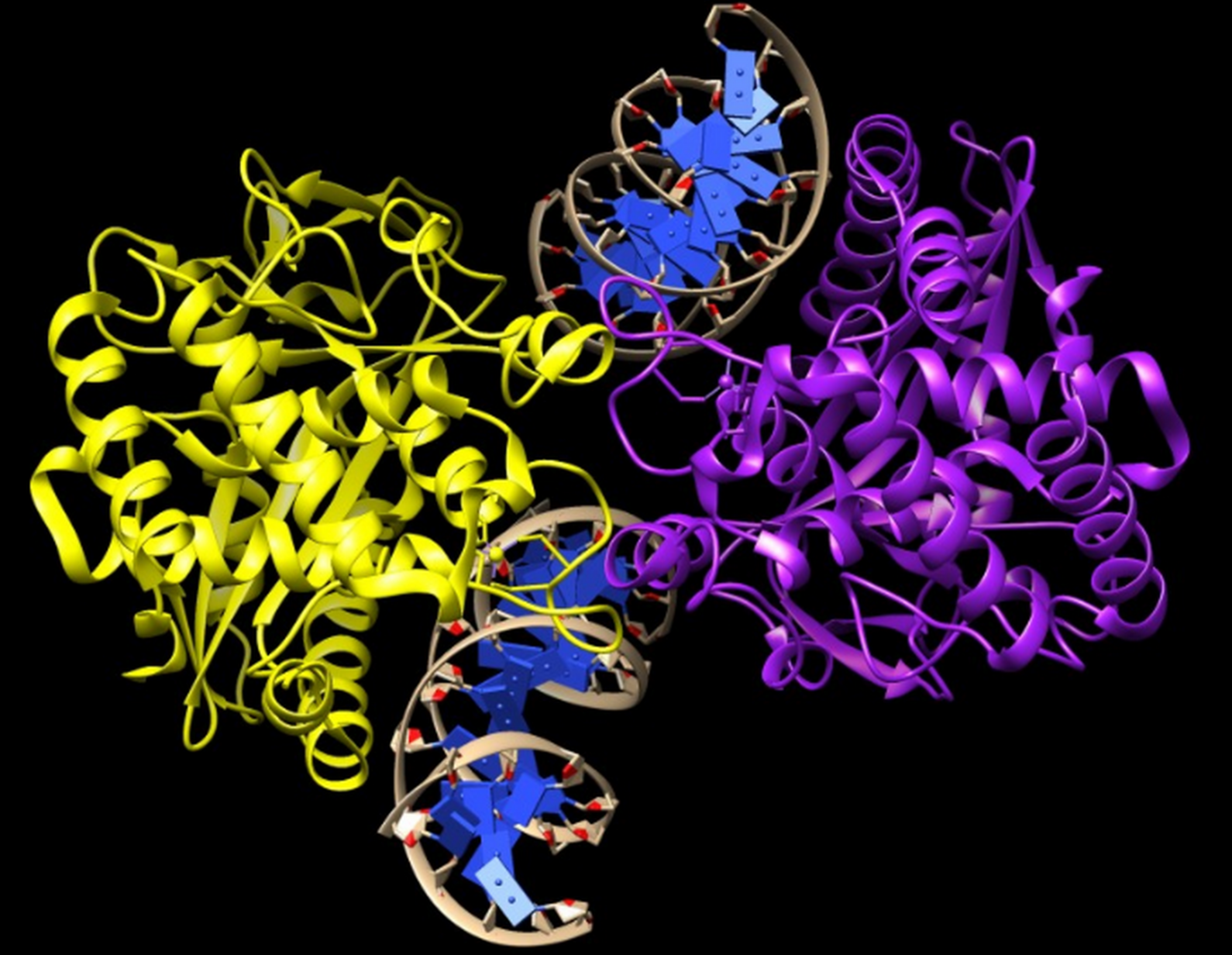
cGAS bound to dsDNA. Adapted from PDB 4O6A.

=== Discovery ===
cGAMP was discovered by Zhijian "James" Chen and colleagues by collecting cytoplasmic extracts from cells transfected with different types of DNA. Cellular extracts were assayed for STING activation by detecting activated IRF3 dimers. Using affinity purification chromatography, the STING activating substance was purified and mass spectrometry was used to identify the substance as cyclic-GMP-AMP (cGAMP).

Chemically synthesized cGAMP was shown to trigger IRF3 activation and IFN-β production. cGAMP was found to be much more potent than other cyclic di-nucleotides (c-di-GMP and c-di-AMP). cGAMP was shown to definitively bind STING by using radiolabeled cGAMP cross-linked to STING. Adding in unlabeled cGAMP, c-di-GMP, or c-di-AMP was found to compete with radio-labeled cGAMP, suggesting that CDN binding sites overlap. It was later shown that cGAMP has a unique 2'-5' phosphodiester bond, which differs from conventional 3'-5' linked CDNs and that this bond may explain some of the unique signaling properties of cGAMP.

=== Transport and degradation ===
cGAMP cannot passively cross cell membranes, but cells can release it into the extracellular space, where it acts as an intercellular signal that activates STING in neighboring cells. cGAMP is exported in part by ATP binding cassette transporter ABCC1, also known as multidrug resistance-associated protein 1 (MRP1). ABCC1 directly transports cGAMP out of cells in an ATP-dependent manner.

Extracellular cGAMP enters recipient cells through several membrane transporters and channels, including SLC19A1, SLC46A2, and volume-regulated anion channels (VRACs) containing LRRC8A. The ATP-gated ion channel P2X7 also facilitates cGAMP update in macrophages. cGAMP can pass directly between adjacent cells through gap junctions, without entering the extracellular space, or be packaged into viral particles that deliver it to newly infected cells. Extracellular cGAMP is degraded by the ectonucleotide pyrophosphatase/phosphodiesterases ENPP1 and ENPP3, which hydrolyze cGAMP and limit its availability for intercellular STING signaling. Whether VRAC channels also contribute to cGAMP export under physiological conditions requires further study. Although cGAMP export through these channels has been demonstrated under hypotonic conditions, other studies have reported that LRRC8A-containing channels can mediate both cGAMP import and export.

== Stimulator of interferon genes (STING) ==
STING is an endoplasmic reticulum–resident protein and has been shown to directly bind to a variety of different cyclic-di-nucleotides, such as cyclic adenosine-inosine monophosphate.

=== Expression ===
STING is expressed broadly in numerous tissue types, of both immune and non-immune origin. STING was identified in murine embryonic fibroblasts, and is required for the type 1 interferon response in both immune and non-immune cells.

=== Structure ===
STING is a 379-amino-acid protein. Its N-terminal region (residues 1–154) contains four trans-membrane domains. Its C-terminal domain contains the dimerization domain, the cyclic dinucleotide interaction domain, as well as a domain responsible for interacting and activating TBK1. Upon binding of 2'-3' cGAMP, STING undergoes a significant conformational change (approximately 20 Angstrom inward rotation) that encloses cGAMP.

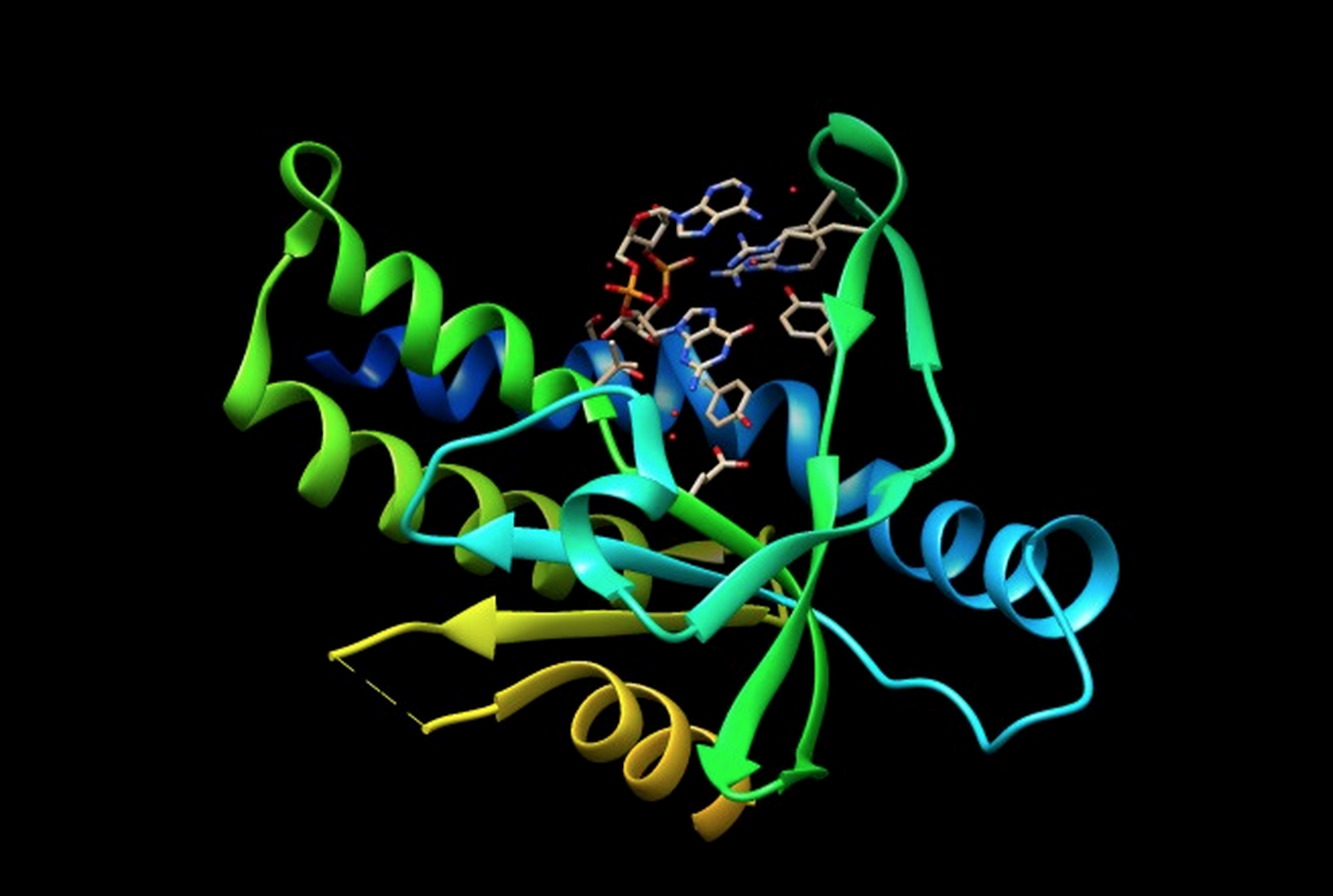
STING bound to cGAMP. While STING exists as a homodimer, only one subunit is shown to highlight the interaction of side chain residues with cGAMP. Adapted from PDB 4KSY

=== Function ===
Upon binding of 2'-3' cGAMP (and other bacterial CDNs), STING activates TBK1 to phosphorylate downstream transcription factors IRF3, which induces the type 1 IFN response, and STAT6, which induces chemokines such as CCL2 and CCL20 independently of IRF3. STING is also thought to activate the NF-κB transcription factor through the activity of the IκB kinase (IKK), though the mechanism of NF-κB activation downstream of STING remains to be determined. The signaling pathways activated by STING combine to induce an innate immune response to cells with ectopic DNA in the cytosol. Loss of STING activity inhibits the ability of mouse embryonic fibroblasts to fight against infection by certain viruses, and more generally, is required for the type 1 IFN response to introduced cytosolic DNA.

STING's general role as an adapter molecule in the cytosolic DNA-type 1 IFN response across cell types has been suggested to function through dendritic cells (DCs). DCs link the innate immune system with the adaptive immune system through phagocytosis and MHC presentation of foreign antigen. The type 1 IFN response initiated by DCs, perhaps through recognition of phagocytosed DNA, has an important co-stimulatory effect. This has recently led to speculation that 2'-3' cGAMP could be used as a more efficient and direct adjuvant than DNA to induce immune responses.

=== Allelic variation ===
Naturally occurring variations in human STING (hSTING) have been found at amino acid position 232 (R232 and H232). H232 variants have diminished type 1 IFN responses and mutation at this position to alanine abrogates the response to bacterial CDNs. Substitutions enhancing ligand binding were also found. G230A substitutions were shown to increase hSTING signaling upon c-di-GMP binding. This residue is found on the lid of the binding pocket, possibly increasing c-di-GMP binding ability.

== Biological importance ==
=== Role in viral response ===
The cGAS-cGAMP-STING pathway is able to generate interferon beta in response to cytosolic DNA. It was shown that DNA viruses, such as HSV-1, are able to trigger cGAMP production and subsequent activation of interferon beta via STING . RNA viruses, such as VSV or Sendai virus, are unable to trigger interferon via cGAS-STING. cGAS or STING defective mice are unable to produce interferon in response to HSV-1 infection which eventually leads to death, while mice with normal cGAS and STING function are able to recover.

Retroviruses, such as HIV-1, were also shown to activate IFN via the cGAS/STING pathway. In these studies, inhibitors of retroviral reverse transcription abrogated IFN production, suggesting that it is the viral cDNA which is activating cGAS.

=== Role in tumor surveillance ===
The cGAS/STING pathway also has a role in tumor surveillance. In response to cellular stress, such as DNA damage, cells will upregulate NKG2D ligands so that they may be recognized and destroyed by Natural Killer (NK) and T cells. In many tumor cells, the DNA damage response is constitutively active, leading to the accumulation of cytoplasmic DNA. This activates the cGAS/STING pathway leading to activation of IRF3. It was shown in lymphoma cells that the NKG2D ligand, Rae1, was upregulated in a STING/IRF3 dependent manner. Transfection of DNA into these cells also triggered Rae1 expression that was dependent on STING. In this model, the transcription factor IRF3, via cGAS/STING, upregulates stress-induced ligands, such as Rae1, in tumor cells, so as to aid in NK-mediated tumor clearance. Moreover, activation of the STING pathway in bone marrow macrophages has been shown to inhibit the growth of acute myeloid leukaemia cells in mice models.

=== Role in autoimmune disease ===
Cytoplasmic DNA, due to viral infection, can lead to activation of interferon beta to help clear the infection. However, chronic activation of STING, due to host DNA in the cytosol, can also activate the cGAS/STING pathway, leading to autoimmune disorders. An example of this occurs in Aicardi–Goutières syndrome (AGS). Mutations in the 3' repair exonuclease, TREX1, cause endogenous retroelements to accumulate in the cytosol, which can lead to cGAS/STING activation, resulting in IFN production. Excessive IFN production leads to an over-active immune system, resulting in AGS and other immune disorders. In mice, it was found that autoimmune symptoms associated with TREX1 deficiency were relieved by cGAS, STING, or IRF3 knockout, implying the importance of aberrant DNA sensing in autoimmune disorders. In TREX1-deficient mice, loss of the cGAMP exporter ABCC1 accelerates STING-dependent autoimmune diseases, indicating that cGAMP export can modify disease severity.

=== Role in cellular senescence ===
It has been shown that the depletion of cGAS and STING in mouse embryonic fibroblasts and in primary human fibroblasts prevents senescence and SASP (senescence-associated secretory phenotype) establishment.

=== Therapeutic role ===
==== Potential vaccine adjuvant ====
DNA has been shown to be a potent adjuvant to boost the immune response to antigens encoded by vaccines. cGAMP, through IRF3 activation of STING, stimulates transcription of interferon. This makes cGAMP a potential vaccine adjuvant capable of boosting inflammatory responses. Studies have shown that vaccines encoded with the chicken antigen, ovalbumin (OVA), in conjunction with cGAMP, were able to activate antigen-specific T and B cells in a STING-dependent manner in vivo. When stimulated with OVA peptide, the T cells from mice vaccinated with OVA + cGAMP were shown to have elevated IFN-g and IL-2 when compared to animals receiving only OVA. Furthermore, the enhanced stability of cGAMP, due to the unique 2'-5' phosphodiester bond, may make it a preferred adjuvant to DNA for in vivo applications.
