= ABCC1 =

Protein-coding gene in the species Homo sapiens

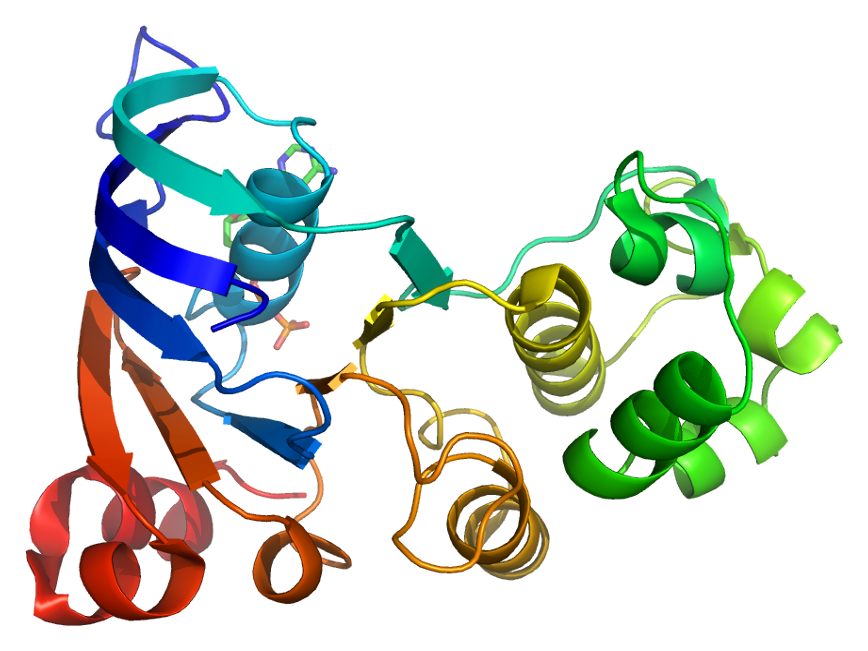

Identifiers
- Aliases: ABCC1, ABC29, ABCC, GS-X, MRP, MRP1, ATP binding cassette subfamily C member 1, DFNA77
- External IDs: OMIM: 158343; MGI: 102676; GeneCards: ABCC1
Available structures
PDB	Ortholog search: PDBe RCSB
PDB	List of PDB id codes 2CBZ, 4C3Z
Enzyme activity
EC #	BRENDA	ExPASy	KEGG	MetaCyc
7.6.2.2	↗	↗	↗	↗
7.6.2.3	↗	↗	↗	↗

Gene location (Human)
Chr.	Chromosome 16 (human)
Band	16p13.11	Start	15,949,138 bp
Band	16p13.11	End	16,143,257 bp

Gene location (Mouse)
Chr.	Chromosome 16 (mouse)
Band	16|16 A1	Start	14,179,422 bp
Band	16|16 A1	End	14,293,601 bp
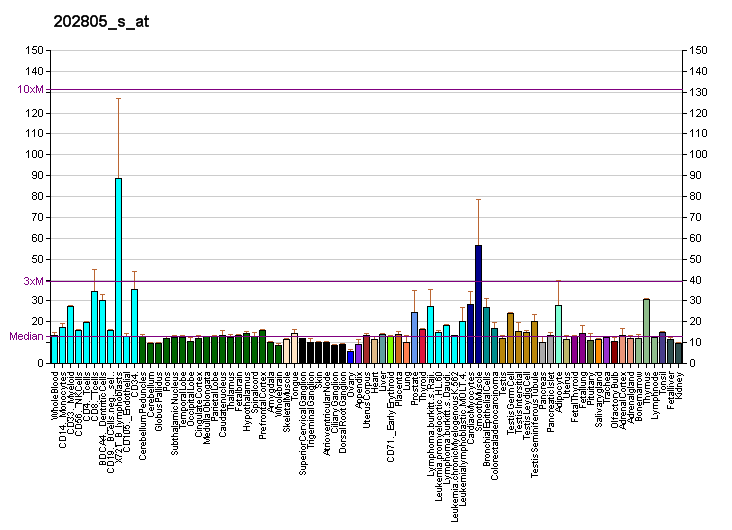

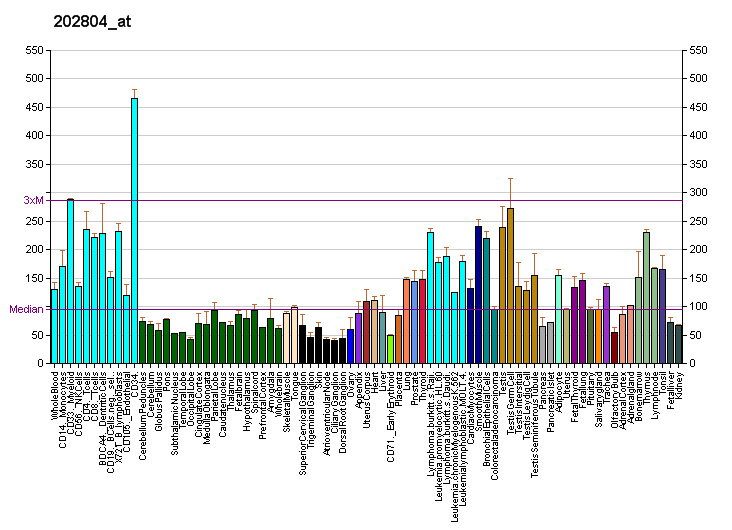
RNA expression pattern
Bgee	Human / Mouse (ortholog); Top expressed in: stromal cell of endometrium; ascending aorta; gastric mucosa; left lobe of thyroid gland; right lobe of thyroid gland; Descending thoracic aorta; prostate; bone marrow cell; skeletal muscle tissue; spleen / Top expressed in: stroma of bone marrow; skin of external ear; endothelial cell of lymphatic vessel; olfactory epithelium; conjunctival fornix; ankle; ascending aorta; retinal pigment epithelium; tunica media of zone of aorta; hair follicle; More reference expression data
BioGPS	More reference expression data
Gene ontology
Molecular function	ATPase-coupled transmembrane transporter activity; nucleotide binding; ATPase activity; hydrolase activity; ATP binding; transporter activity; ATPase-coupled inorganic anion transmembrane transporter activity; ABC-type vitamin B12 transporter activity; ABC-type xenobiotic transporter activity; ABC-type glutathione S-conjugate transporter activity; glutathione transmembrane transporter activity; ATPase-coupled intramembrane lipid transporter activity; sphingolipid floppase activity; transmembrane transporter activity
Cellular component	integral component of membrane; plasma membrane; basolateral plasma membrane; membrane; extracellular exosome; integral component of plasma membrane; vacuolar membrane
Biological process	cobalamin metabolic process; leukotriene metabolic process; transmembrane transport; cobalamin transport; vitamin transmembrane transport; xenobiotic transmembrane transport; glutathione transmembrane transport; xenobiotic transport; transport; phospholipid translocation; cell chemotaxis; sphingolipid translocation
Sources:Amigo / QuickGO
Orthologs
Databases	NCBI: entry; OMA: entry
Species	Human	Mouse
Entrez	4363	17250
Ensembl	ENSG00000278183; ENSG00000103222	ENSMUSG00000023088
UniProt	P33527	O35379
RefSeq (mRNA)	NM_004996; NM_019862; NM_019898; NM_019899; NM_019900 NM_019901; NM_019902	NM_008576
RefSeq (protein)	NP_004987	NP_032602
Location (UCSC)	Chr 16: 15.95 – 16.14 Mb	Chr 16: 14.18 – 14.29 Mb
PubMed search
- Wikidata
View/Edit Human	View/Edit Mouse

Multidrug resistance-associated protein 1 (MRP1) is a protein that in humans is encoded by the ABCC1 gene.

== Function ==
The protein encoded by this gene is a member of the superfamily of ATP-binding cassette (ABC) transporters. ABC proteins transport various molecules across extra-and intra-cellular membranes. ABC genes are divided into seven distinct subfamilies (ABC1, MDR/TAP, MRP, ALD, OABP, GCN20, White). This full transporter is a member of the MRP subfamily which is involved in multi-drug resistance. This protein functions as a multispecific organic anion transporter, with oxidized glutathione, cysteinyl leukotrienes, and activated aflatoxin B1 as substrates. This protein also transports glucuronides and sulfate conjugates of steroid hormones and bile salts. Alternative splicing by exon deletion results in several splice variants but maintains the original open reading frame in all forms.

== Structure ==
ABCC1 is a 190 kDa protein that contains two membrane-spanning domains of hydrophobic nature and two nucleotide binding domains. Each membrane-spanning domain is made up of six α-helices. In addition, the protein also contains a third membrane-spanning domain that sets it apart from other transporters within the ATP-binding cassette family of transporters. The two nucleotide binding domains have a functional asymmetry that plays a significant role in the ability of ATP to power the transporter. The first nucleotide binding domain, which is delegated NBD1, is responsible for the strong attraction of ATP to the transporter. The second nucleotide binding domain, NBD2, is the domain responsible for the hydrolysis of ATP. This asymmetry is specific to the C subfamily of ABC transporters and is generally not found in other transporters. ABCC1 is a highly conserved gene with polymorphisms occurring at very low frequencies of less than five percent. Polymorphisms in this gene are generally found in the form of a single-nucleotide polymorphism (SNP). The greatest ethnic differences in polymorphisms within the ABCC1 are found between Caucasian and Asian populations. There are multiple examples of single nucleotide polymorphisms that are shared among Asian populations but not found in Caucasian populations and vice versa.

== Genomic location and tissue expression ==
The ABCC1 gene, the gene that encodes the ABCC1 protein, is found on chromosome 16 within the nucleus. The protein resides intracellularly on the basolateral side of the plasma membrane which differs from other ATP-binding cassette transporters that are found on the apical side of the membrane. While ABCC1 is generally found throughout most tissues in humans, it is particularly prevalent in the lungs, spleen, testes, kidneys, placenta, thyroid, bladder, and adrenal glands. It is also found in the endothelium cells of the blood-brain barrier.

== Clinical significance ==
=== Effect of polymorphisms ===
Certain polymorphisms in the ABCC1 gene have been shown to be connected with an increased susceptibility to certain types of cancer. A G2168A polymorphism and polymorphisms found in the 3'-UTR region of the gene have been shown to have a connection with increased susceptibility to lung cancer, especially in Chinese populations. Carriers of the G2168A polymorphism contract lung cancer at a rate nearly four times higher than those individuals that do not have the mutation in the gene. Polymorphisms within the ABCC1 gene also tend to have a substantial effect on the severity of a disease. Examples of these diseases includes cystic fibrosis (CF) and chronic obstructive pulmonary disease (COPD). In reference to cystic fibrosis, individuals with a G-260C polymorphism in the 5'-UTR area of the ABCC1 gene tended to have a much more severe case of cystic fibrosis than individuals with the wild-type gene. Individuals with chronic obstructive pulmonary disorder were impacted by two polymorphisms in the ABCC1 gene. If an individual had a 3'-UTR T866A polymorphism, they generally had a less severe case of COPD marked by less inflammation in their airways. On the other hand, an individual with a 3'-UTR G3361A polymorphism generally had a more severe case of COPD that was accompanied by a greater amount of inflammation in their airways.

=== Alzheimer's disease ===
The ATP-binding cassette protein ABCC1 has received attention in the last decade due to its possible connection with Alzheimer's disease. One of the more prominent signs of Alzheimer's disease is the accumulation of β-amyloid proteins in the brain. As these proteins accumulate, they begin to form plaques that interfere with signaling between cells of the nervous system found within the brain. Due to its presence in the choroid plexus and blood-brain barrier and its ability to transport multiple kinds of molecules out of cells, ABCC1 has been a point of interest in many Alzheimer's disease studies. The transporter protein has been shown to decrease β-amyloid accumulation by nearly 80 percent when activated, leading researchers to further investigation on its use in future treatments of Alzheimer's and other neurological disorders.

=== Role in cancer ===
ABCC1 plays a role in the multidrug resistance of cancerous tumor cells due to its ability to transport many chemotherapeutic drugs out of the cells. The ABCC1 transporter protein is especially prevalent in neuroblastoma and cancer cells found in the lung, breast and prostate. In non-small cell lung carcinoma and small cell lung carcinoma, higher expression of ABCC1 was indicative of a reduced response to chemotherapeutic drugs and a lower rate of survival. Similar results were found in early-stage breast cancer where the increased expression of the transporter gene correlated with shorter times until a relapse occurred and lower rates of survival. In prostate cancer, expression of ABCC1 was found to increase with the stage of the disease while allowing resistance to chemotherapeutic drugs.

=== Role in innate immunity ===
Cyclic GMP-AMP (cGAMP), the second messenger produced by the cGAS-STING cytosolic DNA sensing pathway, is a direct, ATP-dependent and glutathione-independent substrate of ABCC1. Export of cGAMP by ABCC1 reduces its intracellular concentration and limits activation of STING. In mice lacking TREX1, ABCC1 deficiency increases cGAMP-dependent STING signaling and accelerates autoimmune disease in a model of Aicardi-Goutières syndrome.

== Animal studies ==
Because of its significant role in the transportation of organic anion molecules and recent association with multiple illnesses including Alzheimer's disease (AD), the ABCC1 protein has become a potential drug target. In ABBC1 knockout mice, β-amyloid clearance is much lower than in wild-type mice that expressed the gene. Furthermore, in mouse models of AD, treatment with thiethylperazine, a drug that activates ABBC1, increases β-amyloid clearance and decreases in the amount of β-amyloid found in the brains.

St. John's wort, a substance containing the chemical hyperforin, has also been shown to have a positive effect on activity levels of ABCC1. In a study of the effects of St. John's wort on APP-tg mice, an extract of St. John's wort that contained decreased levels of hyperforin increased the activity of ABCC1 by 70 percent and led to decreased amounts of β-amyloid in the brain and increased cognitive function in the mice.

== Interactive pathway map ==
Click on genes, proteins and metabolites below to link to respective articles. (Note: The interactive pathway map can be edited at WikiPathways: "IrinotecanPathway_WP229".)

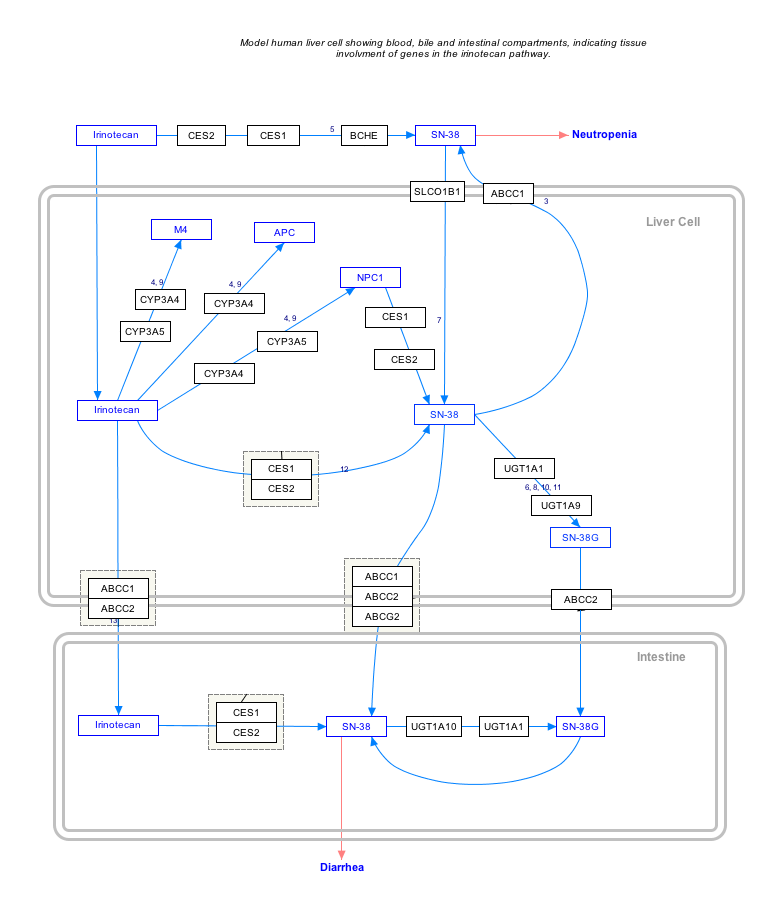

Irinotecan Pathway edit

== See also ==
- ATP-binding cassette transporter
- P-glycoprotein (Multidrug resistance protein- MDR1). Not to be confused with Multidrug resistance-associated protein (MRP1)
