= SN-011 =

Identifiers
- IUPAC name: N-[3-[(4-fluorophenyl)sulfonylamino]-4-hydroxyphenyl]-4-phenylbenzamide
- CAS Number: 2249435-90-1
- PubChem CID: 138005721
- ChemSpider: 71001485
- ChEMBL: ChEMBL5189857
- ECHA InfoCard: 100.336.453

Chemical and physical data
- Formula: C_{25}H_{19}FN_{2}O_{4}S
- Molar mass: 462.50 g·mol^{−1}
- 3D model (JSmol): Interactive image
- SMILES: C1=CC=C(C=C1)C2=CC=C(C=C2)C(=O)NC3=CC(=C(C=C3)O)NS(=O)(=O)C4=CC=C(C=C4)F
- InChI: InChI=1S/C25H19FN2O4S/c26-20-10-13-22(14-11-20)33(31,32)28-23-16-21(12-15-24(23)29)27-25(30)19-8-6-18(7-9-19)17-4-2-1-3-5-17/h1-16,28-29H,(H,27,30); Key:GPXQUPCJIJBXHJ-UHFFFAOYSA-N

SN-011 is an experimental drug which acts as a potent antagonist of the stimulator of interferon genes (STING) protein. It binds with higher affinity to the cyclic dinucleotide binding pocket of STING than the endogenous activator 2'3'-cGAMP, and thereby prevents STING activation. SN-011 has antiinflammatory and antiviral effects by reducing cytokine signalling, and has potential application in numerous disease states in which inflammation plays a role.

== See also ==
- H-151
- STING-IN-2
