= C17H17N3O =

The molecular formula C_{17}H_{17}N_{3}O may refer to:

- H-151
- Ramosetron
