= C15H16N2O4 =

The molecular formula C_{15}H_{16}N_{2}O_{4} may refer to:

- Apaziquone
- STING-IN-2
