= LRRC8A =

Protein found in humans

Identifiers
- Aliases: LRRC8A, AGM5, LRRC8, SWELL1, leucine-rich repeat containing 8 family member A, leucine rich repeat containing 8 family member A, leucine rich repeat containing 8 VRAC subunit A, HsLRRC8A
- External IDs: OMIM: 608360; MGI: 2652847; GeneCards: LRRC8A

Gene location (Human)
Chr.	Chromosome 9 (human)
Band	9q34.11	Start	128,882,133 bp
Band	9q34.11	End	128,918,039 bp

Gene location (Mouse)
Chr.	Chromosome 2 (mouse)
Band	2|2 B	Start	30,127,727 bp
Band	2|2 B	End	30,153,802 bp
RNA expression pattern
Bgee	Human / Mouse (ortholog); Top expressed in: gingival epithelium; nasal epithelium; decidua; visceral pleura; external globus pallidus; cardiac muscle tissue of right atrium; pars reticulata; entorhinal cortex; Brodmann area 23; skin of arm / Top expressed in: ankle joint; superior surface of tongue; gallbladder; ciliary body; secondary oocyte; cardiac muscle tissue of left ventricle; retinal pigment epithelium; decidua; gastrula; choroid plexus of fourth ventricle; More reference expression data
BioGPS	n/a
Gene ontology
Molecular function	anion channel activity; protein binding; volume-sensitive anion channel activity; identical protein binding
Cellular component	integral component of membrane; cell surface; ion channel complex; membrane; cytoplasm; plasma membrane; integral component of plasma membrane
Biological process	pre-B cell differentiation; response to osmotic stress; cell volume homeostasis; cell differentiation; ion transport; anion transport; regulation of anion transport; anion transmembrane transport; signal transduction; transmembrane transport; transport; inorganic anion transport; taurine transport; aspartate transmembrane transport; protein hexamerization
Sources:Amigo / QuickGO
Orthologs
Databases	NCBI: entry; OMA: entry
Species	Human	Mouse
Entrez	56262	241296
Ensembl	ENSG00000136802	ENSMUSG00000007476
UniProt	Q8IWT6	Q80WG5
RefSeq (mRNA)	NM_001127244; NM_001127245; NM_019594	NM_177725
RefSeq (protein)	NP_001120716; NP_001120717; NP_062540	NP_808393
Location (UCSC)	Chr 9: 128.88 – 128.92 Mb	Chr 2: 30.13 – 30.15 Mb
PubMed search
- Wikidata
View/Edit Human	View/Edit Mouse

Leucine-rich repeat-containing protein 8A is a protein that in humans is encoded by the LRRC8A gene.

== Structure ==
LRRC8A is a subunit of the heteromeric volume-regulated anion channel (VRAC), which also contains other members of the LRRC8 protein family: LRRC8B, LRRC8C, LRRC8D or LRRC8E. The transmembrane regions of LRRC8 proteins are similar to those of pannexins.

LRRC8A alone can assemble into homohexameric channels. Structures of mouse and human LRRC8A channels have been determined by cryo-electron microscopy.

== Function ==
VRACs contribute to cell-volume regulation by transporting chloride ions and organic osmolytes, including taurine and glutamate, across the plasma membrane. LRRC8A is required for VRAC function, but is insufficient on its own to reproduce the full range of typical VRAC activity. The other LRRC8 subunits influence the channel's substrate specificity.

LRRC8A-containing VRACs also transport cyclic-GMP-AMP (cGAMP), allowing extracellular cGAMP to enter cells and activate the cGAS–STING cytosolic DNA sensing pathway. This activity has been identified in channels containing LRRC8A together with LRRC8C or LRRC8E. Mice lacking LRRC8E show reduced interferon responses and impaired immunity following HSV-1 infection. LRRC8 channels can transport cGAMP in either direction according to its electrochemical gradient, although their physiological contribution to cGAMP export remains unclear.

== Clinical signficance ==
A congenital mutation in LRRC8A has been associated with agammaglobulinemia-5.
