= LRRC8D =

Protein-coding gene in humans

Identifiers
- Aliases: LRRC8D, LRRC5, leucine-rich repeat containing 8 family member D, leucine rich repeat containing 8 family member D, leucine rich repeat containing 8 VRAC subunit D, HsLRRC8D
- External IDs: OMIM: 612890; MGI: 1922368; GeneCards: LRRC8D

Gene location (Human)
Chr.	Chromosome 1 (human)
Band	1p22.2	Start	89,821,014 bp
Band	1p22.2	End	89,936,611 bp

Gene location (Mouse)
Chr.	Chromosome 5 (mouse)
Band	5|5 E5	Start	105,847,835 bp
Band	5|5 E5	End	105,980,302 bp
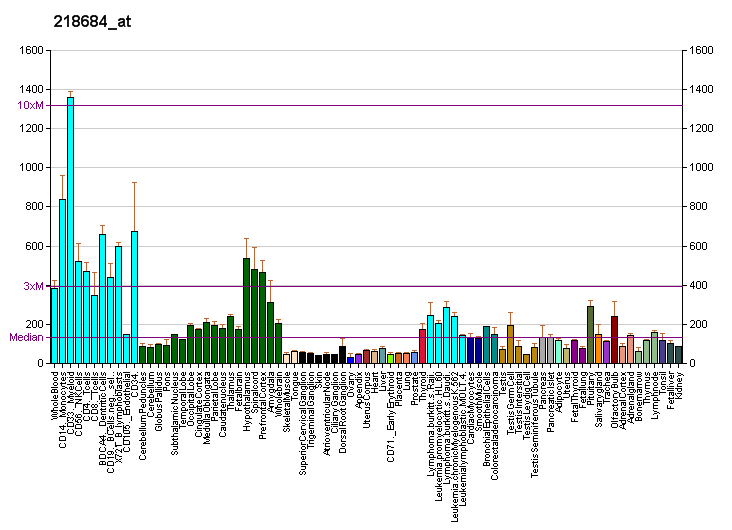
RNA expression pattern
Bgee	Human / Mouse (ortholog); Top expressed in: inferior ganglion of vagus nerve; subthalamic nucleus; trigeminal ganglion; external globus pallidus; medulla oblongata; superior vestibular nucleus; corpus callosum; ventral tegmental area; gingival epithelium; Region I of hippocampus proper / Top expressed in: otolith organ; utricle; superior cervical ganglion; stria vascularis; medullary collecting duct; trigeminal ganglion; Rostral migratory stream; median eminence; cumulus cell; vestibular sensory epithelium; More reference expression data
BioGPS	More reference expression data
Gene ontology
Molecular function	protein binding; volume-sensitive anion channel activity
Cellular component	cytoplasm; integral component of membrane; integral component of plasma membrane; endoplasmic reticulum membrane; membrane; endoplasmic reticulum; ion channel complex; plasma membrane
Biological process	anion transmembrane transport; ion transport; regulation of anion transport; signal transduction; transmembrane transport; transport; cell volume homeostasis; inorganic anion transport; taurine transport; aspartate transmembrane transport; cellular response to osmotic stress
Sources:Amigo / QuickGO
Orthologs
Databases	NCBI: entry; OMA: entry
Species	Human	Mouse
Entrez	55144	231549
Ensembl	ENSG00000171492	ENSMUSG00000046079
UniProt	Q7L1W4	Q8BGR2
RefSeq (mRNA)	NM_001134479; NM_018103	NM_001122768; NM_178701
RefSeq (protein)	NP_001127951; NP_060573	NP_001116240; NP_848816
Location (UCSC)	Chr 1: 89.82 – 89.94 Mb	Chr 5: 105.85 – 105.98 Mb
PubMed search
- Wikidata
View/Edit Human	View/Edit Mouse

Leucine-rich repeat-containing protein 8D is a protein that in humans is encoded by the LRRC8D gene. Researchers have found out that this protein, along with the other LRRC8 proteins LRRC8A, LRRC8B, LRRC8C, and LRRC8E, is a subunit of the heteromer protein volume-regulated anion channel. Volume-Regulated Anion Channels (VRACs) are crucial to the regulation of cell size by transporting chloride ions and various organic osmolytes, such as taurine or glutamate, across the plasma membrane, and that is not the only function these channels have been linked to.

While LRRC8D is one of many proteins that can be part of VRAC, it is in fact one of the most important subunits for the channel's ability to function; the other protein of importance is LRRC8A. However, while we know it is necessary for specific VRAC function, other studies have found that it is not sufficient for the full range of usual VRAC activity. This is where the other LRRC8 proteins come in, as the different composition of these subunits affects the range of specificity for VRACs.

In addition to its role in VRACs, the LRRC8 protein family is also associated with agammaglobulinemia-5.
