= CGAS (gene) =

Protein-coding gene in the species Homo sapiens

Identifiers
- Aliases: CGAS, C6orf150, cGAS, h-cGAS, Mab-21 domain containing 1, MB21D1, cyclic GMP-AMP synthase, Cyclic GMP-AMP synthase
- External IDs: OMIM: 613973; MGI: 2442261; GeneCards: CGAS
Available structures
PDB	Ortholog search: PDBe RCSB
PDB	List of PDB id codes 4LEW, 4KM5, 4O67, 4MKP, 4LEV, 4O68, 4O69
Enzyme activity
EC #	BRENDA	ExPASy	KEGG	MetaCyc
2.7.7.86	↗	↗	↗	↗

Gene location (Human)
Chr.	Chromosome 6 (human)
Band	6q13	Start	73,413,515 bp
Band	6q13	End	73,452,297 bp

Gene location (Mouse)
Chr.	Chromosome 9 (mouse)
Band	9|9 E1	Start	78,337,808 bp
Band	9|9 E1	End	78,350,519 bp
RNA expression pattern
Bgee	Human / Mouse (ortholog); Top expressed in: pancreatic ductal cell; buccal mucosa cell; endothelial cell; monocyte; bone marrow cell; granulocyte; blood; lymph node; external globus pallidus; cardia / Top expressed in: secondary oocyte; primary oocyte; zygote; spermatocyte; Paneth cell; vas deferens; condyle; fossa; conjunctival fornix; bone marrow; More reference expression data
BioGPS	n/a
Gene ontology
Molecular function	nucleotidyltransferase activity; nucleotide binding; metal ion binding; GTP binding; transferase activity; ATP binding; DNA binding; 2',3'-cyclic GMP-AMP synthase activity; double-stranded DNA binding; chromatin binding; protein binding
Cellular component	cytoplasm; cytosol
Biological process	immune system process; cyclic nucleotide biosynthetic process; cellular response to exogenous dsRNA; innate immune response; activation of innate immune response; defense response to virus; positive regulation of defense response to virus by host; cellular response to DNA damage stimulus; positive regulation of type I interferon production; paracrine signaling; positive regulation of cellular senescence; positive regulation of cGMP-mediated signaling; positive regulation of cAMP-mediated signaling; regulation of immunoglobulin production; determination of adult lifespan; regulation of type I interferon production; regulation of immune response; regulation of T cell activation
Sources:Amigo / QuickGO
Orthologs
Databases	NCBI: entry; OMA: entry
Species	Human	Mouse
Entrez	115004	214763
Ensembl	ENSG00000164430	ENSMUSG00000032344
UniProt	Q8N884	Q8C6L5
RefSeq (mRNA)	NM_138441	NM_173386
RefSeq (protein)	NP_612450	NP_775562
Location (UCSC)	Chr 6: 73.41 – 73.45 Mb	Chr 9: 78.34 – 78.35 Mb
PubMed search
- Wikidata
View/Edit Human	View/Edit Mouse

Cyclic GMP-AMP synthase is an enzyme that in humans is encoded by the CGAS gene (previously MB21D1). In particular, it functions as a cyclic GMP-AMP synthase, which is a type of nucleotidyltransferase.
