= STING-IN-2 =

Identifiers
- IUPAC name: N-(4-butylphenyl)-5-nitrofuran-2-carboxamide
- CAS Number: 346691-38-1
- PubChem CID: 2059265
- ChEMBL: ChEMBL5170613

Chemical and physical data
- Formula: C_{15}H_{16}N_{2}O_{4}
- Molar mass: 288.303 g·mol^{−1}
- 3D model (JSmol): Interactive image
- SMILES: CCCCC1=CC=C(C=C1)NC(=O)C2=CC=C(O2)[N+](=O)[O-]
- InChI: InChI=1S/C15H16N2O4/c1-2-3-4-11-5-7-12(8-6-11)16-15(18)13-9-10-14(21-13)17(19)20/h5-10H,2-4H2,1H3,(H,16,18); Key:QMVOHFICEFYHMK-UHFFFAOYSA-N

STING-IN-2 (C-170) is an experimental drug which acts as an irreversible antagonist of the stimulator of interferon genes (STING) protein. It has antiinflammatory, antiviral and potential anti-cancer effects by reducing cytokine signalling, and has potential application in numerous disease states in which inflammation plays a role.

== See also ==
- H-151
- SN-011
