= Cyclic adenosine-inosine monophosphate =

Antiviral drug

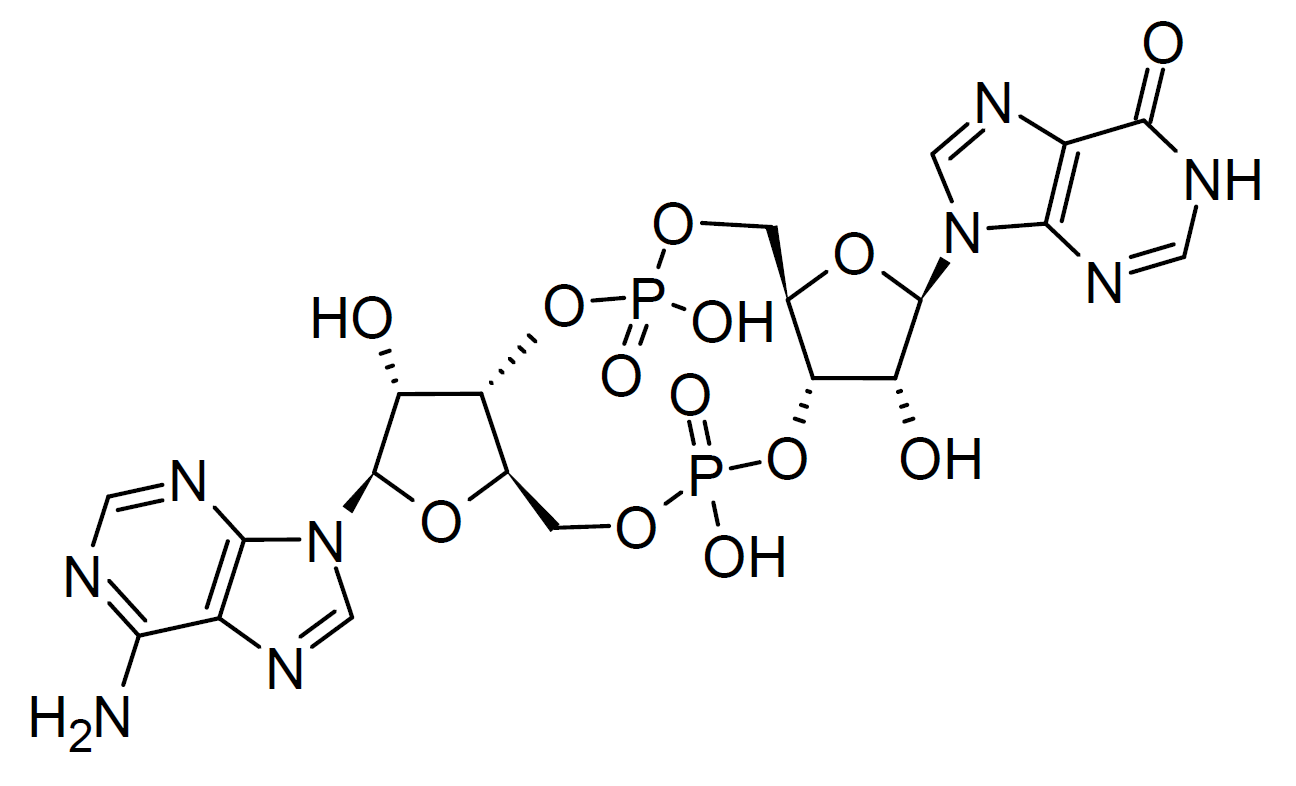

Identifiers
- IUPAC name: 9-[(1S,6R,8R,9R,10S,15R,17R,18R)-17-(6-aminopurin-9-yl)-3,9,12,18-tetrahydroxy-3,12-dioxo-2,4,7,11,13,16-hexaoxa-3λ^{5},12λ^{5}-diphosphatricyclo[13.3.0.0^{6,10}]octadecan-8-yl]-1H-purin-6-one
- CAS Number: 1507367-51-2
- PubChem CID: 136247207
- ChemSpider: 129497681
- ChEMBL: ChEMBL4776666

Chemical and physical data
- Formula: C_{20}H_{23}N_{9}O_{13}P_{2}
- Molar mass: 659.402 g·mol^{−1}
- 3D model (JSmol): Interactive image
- SMILES: C1[C@@H]2[C@H]([C@H]([C@@H](O2)N3C=NC4=C3N=CNC4=O)O)OP(=O)(OC[C@@H]5[C@H]([C@H]([C@@H](O5)N6C=NC7=C(N=CN=C76)N)O)OP(=O)(O1)O)O
- InChI: InChI=1S/C20H23N9O13P2/c21-15-9-16(23-3-22-15)28(5-26-9)19-11(30)13-7(39-19)1-37-44(35,36)42-14-8(2-38-43(33,34)41-13)40-20(12(14)31)29-6-27-10-17(29)24-4-25-18(10)32/h3-8,11-14,19-20,30-31H,1-2H2,(H,33,34)(H,35,36)(H2,21,22,23)(H,24,25,32)/t7-,8-,11-,12-,13-,14-,19-,20-/m1/s1; Key:SBNULQXUGGEMOY-XPWFQUROSA-N

Cyclic adenosine-inosine monophosphate (cAIMP, CL-592) is an experimental antiviral drug. It is the best studied of a range of related analogues which act as agonists of the Stimulator of interferon genes (STING) receptor which mediates interferon production by the immune system. It shows broad spectrum antiviral activity against a range of viruses including SARS-CoV-2 and enterovirus 68, and in studies on mice prevented the development of arthritis following infection with Chikungunya virus.

== See also ==
- Tilorone
