= LRRC8B =

Protein found in humans

Identifiers
- Aliases: LRRC8B, TA-LRRP, TALRRP, leucine-rich repeat containing 8 family member B, leucine rich repeat containing 8 family member B, leucine rich repeat containing 8 VRAC subunit B
- External IDs: OMIM: 612888; MGI: 2141353; GeneCards: LRRC8B

Gene location (Human)
| Chr. | Chromosome 1 (human) |
| Band | 1p22.2 | Start | 89,524,829 bp |
| Band | 1p22.2 | End | 89,597,861 bp |

Gene location (Mouse)
| Chr. | Chromosome 5 (mouse) |
| Band | 5|5 E5 | Start | 105,563,641 bp |
| Band | 5|5 E5 | End | 105,637,940 bp |
RNA expression pattern
| Bgee | Human / Mouse (ortholog); Top expressed in: Brodmann area 23; middle temporal gyrus; endothelial cell; oocyte; secondary oocyte; orbitofrontal cortex; superior frontal gyrus; Brodmann area 46; primary visual cortex; postcentral gyrus / Top expressed in: secondary oocyte; otolith organ; utricle; vestibular membrane of cochlear duct; trigeminal ganglion; zygote; Region I of hippocampus proper; primary oocyte; spermatid; primary motor cortex; More reference expression data |
| BioGPS | n/a |
Gene ontology
| Molecular function | protein binding; volume-sensitive anion channel activity |
| Cellular component | cytoplasm; integral component of membrane; membrane; endoplasmic reticulum; endoplasmic reticulum membrane; plasma membrane; ion channel complex; integral component of plasma membrane |
| Biological process | ion transport; signal transduction; transmembrane transport; inorganic anion transport; cell volume homeostasis; anion transmembrane transport |
Sources:Amigo / QuickGO
Orthologs
| Databases | NCBI: entry; OMA: entry |
| Species | Human | Mouse |
| Entrez | 23507 | 433926 |
| Ensembl | ENSG00000197147 | ENSMUSG00000070639 |
| UniProt | Q6P9F7 | Q5DU41 |
| RefSeq (mRNA) | NM_001134476; NM_015350; NM_001369817; NM_001369819 | NM_001033550 |
| RefSeq (protein) | NP_001127948; NP_056165; NP_001356746; NP_001356748 | NP_001028722 |
| Location (UCSC) | Chr 1: 89.52 – 89.6 Mb | Chr 5: 105.56 – 105.64 Mb |
| PubMed search |
- Wikidata
| View/Edit Human | View/Edit Mouse |

Leucine-rich repeat-containing protein 8B is a protein that in humans is encoded by the LRRC8B gene. Researchers have found out that this protein, along with the other LRRC8 proteins LRRC8A, LRRC8C, LRRC8D, and LRRC8E, is sometimes a subunit of the heteromer protein volume-regulated anion channel (VRAC). VRACs are crucial to the regulation of cell size by transporting chloride ions and various organic osmolytes, such as taurine or glutamate, across the plasma membrane, and that is not the only function these channels have been linked to.

While LRRC8B is one of many proteins that can be part of VRAC, research has found that it is not as crucial to the activity of the channel in comparison to LRRC8A and LRRC8D. However, while we know that LRRC8A and LRRC8D are necessary for VRAC function, other studies have found that they are not sufficient for the full range of usual VRAC activity. This is where the other LRRC8 proteins come in, such as LRRC8B, as the different composition of these subunits affects the range of specificity for VRACs.

In addition to its role in VRACs, the LRRC8 protein family is also associated with agammaglobulinemia-5.
