= LRRC8C =

Protein-coding gene in humans

Identifiers
- Aliases: LRRC8C, AD158, FAD158, leucine-rich repeat containing 8 family member C, leucine rich repeat containing 8 family member C, leucine rich repeat containing 8 VRAC subunit C
- External IDs: OMIM: 612889; MGI: 2140839; GeneCards: LRRC8C

Gene location (Human)
Chr.	Chromosome 1 (human)
Band	1p22.2	Start	89,633,072 bp
Band	1p22.2	End	89,769,903 bp

Gene location (Mouse)
Chr.	Chromosome 5 (mouse)
Band	5|5 E5	Start	105,667,254 bp
Band	5|5 E5	End	105,760,884 bp
RNA expression pattern
Bgee	Human / Mouse (ortholog); Top expressed in: sperm; secondary oocyte; cartilage tissue; myocardium of left ventricle; buccal mucosa cell; white blood cell; monocyte; lower lobe of lung; superficial temporal artery; right ventricle / Top expressed in: left lung lobe; carotid body; ciliary body; vestibular membrane of cochlear duct; right lung lobe; body of femur; endothelial cell of lymphatic vessel; Epithelium of choroid plexus; mesenteric lymph nodes; iris; More reference expression data
BioGPS	n/a
Gene ontology
Molecular function	protein binding; volume-sensitive anion channel activity
Cellular component	cytoplasm; integral component of membrane; integral component of plasma membrane; endoplasmic reticulum membrane; membrane; endoplasmic reticulum; ion channel complex; plasma membrane
Biological process	anion transmembrane transport; ion transport; fat cell differentiation; regulation of anion transport; signal transduction; transmembrane transport; transport; cell volume homeostasis; inorganic anion transport; taurine transport; aspartate transmembrane transport; protein hexamerization; cellular response to osmotic stress
Sources:Amigo / QuickGO
Orthologs
Databases	NCBI: entry; OMA: entry
Species	Human	Mouse
Entrez	84230	100604
Ensembl	ENSG00000171488	ENSMUSG00000054720
UniProt	Q8TDW0	Q8R502
RefSeq (mRNA)	NM_032270	NM_133897
RefSeq (protein)	NP_115646	NP_598658
Location (UCSC)	Chr 1: 89.63 – 89.77 Mb	Chr 5: 105.67 – 105.76 Mb
PubMed search
- Wikidata
View/Edit Human	View/Edit Mouse

Leucine-rich repeat-containing protein 8C is a protein encoded by the human LRRC8C gene.

== Function ==
LRRC8C is one of five LRRC8 proteins—along with LRRC8A, LRRC8B, LRRC8D, and LRRC8E—that can form subunits of the heteromeric volume-regulated anion channel (VRAC). These channels play a vital role in cell volume regulation by transporting chloride ions and organic osmolytes—including taurine and glutamate—across the plasma membrane.

Although LRRC8C can contribute to VRAC composition, it appears to be less essential for VRAC activity than core subunits LRRC8A and LRRC8D. However, studies have shown that LRRC8A and LRRC8D alone are not sufficient to support the full functional diversity of VRACs. The presence of additional LRRC8 subunits, including LRRC8C, modulates substrate selectivity and functional properties of VRACs.

== Clinical significance ==
Recent findings suggest that LRRC8C may have more critical roles than previously recognized. A 2024 study identified monoallelic de novo variants in LRRC8C in two children with a severe congenital multisystem disorder (TIMES syndrome; see OMIM: https://omim.org/entry/621056). These variants led to constitutive VRAC activation, resulting in channel hyperactivity and dysregulated ion transport, highlighting a pathogenic mechanism involving LRRC8C dysfunction.

Beyond its role in VRACs, the LRRC8 protein family has also been linked to agammaglobulinemia-5, a primary immunodeficiency disorder.
