= STING-associated vasculopathy with onset in infancy =

Rare autoinflammatory condition

- Autosomal dominant pattern is the inheritance manner of this condition
- Specialty: Medical genetics
- Causes: Mutations in the TMEM173 gene

STING-associated vasculopathy with onset in infancy (SAVI) is a rare autoinflammatory vasculopathy associated with the stimulator of interferon genes (STING) protein and characterised by severe skin lesions and interstitial lung disease.

== Signs and symptoms ==
The onset is in infancy. The skin lesions occur on cheeks, nose, fingers, toes and soles. They may vary in appearance but frequently develop into non-healing ulcers. Interstitial lung disease is also common. Some individuals may not experience any obvious skin issues. All affected children fail to thrive.

Other features include myositis and joint stiffness. Some children experience hyper mobility, and joint pain.

Imaging:

Chest X-rays show sign consistent with interstitial lung disease.

Bloods:

Anemia, leukopenia, thrombocytosis, T cell lymphopenia with normal B cells and hypergammaglobulinemia may occur.

Autoantibodies may be present including antinuclear, antiphospholipid, and anticardiolipin antibodies.

The erythrocyte sedimentation rate and C reactive protein levels tend to be raised.

Biopsies:

Skin biopsies show inflammation of the capillaries and microthrombosis. Immunoglobulin M and C3 deposition may be present.

Lung biopsies show fibrosing alveolitis, follicular hyperplasia, B-cell germinal centers and interstitial fibrosis. Some children demonstrate pulmonary alveolar protianosis on Lavage.

== Genetics ==
This condition is due to mutations in the TMEM173 gene. This gene is located on the long arm of chromosome 5 (5q31.2) and encodes the stimulator of interferon genes (STING) protein. There are 3 disease causing mutations in the dimerization domain of STING that cause SAVI; V155M, N154S, and V147L.

== Pathopysiology ==
This only partly understood. The wild type protein (STING) is normally found in the cytoplasm of the cell. The mutant forms are located in the Golgi apparatus.

== Diagnosis ==
The condition may be suspected on clinical grounds. The diagnosis is made by sequencing the TMEM173 gene.

== Treatment ==
No specific treatment is known. Management is supportive. Research into the efficacy of a subgroup of medications known as JAK inhibitors (such as Baricitinib) has been studied at the National Institutes of Health, starting in 2014.

== Epidemiology ==
This condition is considered rare, with 9 cases reported in the literature up to 2019.

== Research ==
This disease was first described in 2014. In 2017 a group led by Dr. Jonathan Miner generated the first mouse model of SAVI. Dr. Miner's research team used CRISPR/Cas9 genome editing to introduce a mutation into the mouse STING gene (STING1) that was analogous to a human SAVI-associated mutation. These mice, known as STING N153S or SAVI mice, developed spontaneous lung disease and a severe immunodeficiency to a herpesviruses. SAVI mice also develop lung disease that depends on adaptive immunity, but not on the type I interferon receptor. Whereas SAVI mice also lack lymph nodes and have reduced numbers of innate lymphoid cells (ILCs), patients with SAVI do have lymph nodes despite also having reduced numbers of ILCs. Lung disease in SAVI mice also can be regulated by microbes, which might reflect the capacity of STING to detect or be regulated by microbial metabolites. The Miner laboratory subsequently moved to the University of Pennsylvania (Penn), where research on mechanisms of STING-associated autoimmunity has continued. Other laboratories including those of Kate Fitzgerald (UMass) and Angela Rosen-Wolff (TU Dresden), independently generated the same SAVI mice, as well as additional models, and made similar findings with regard to the role of type I interferon in the mouse model of SAVI.
