= DDX41 =

Protein-coding gene in the species Homo sapiens

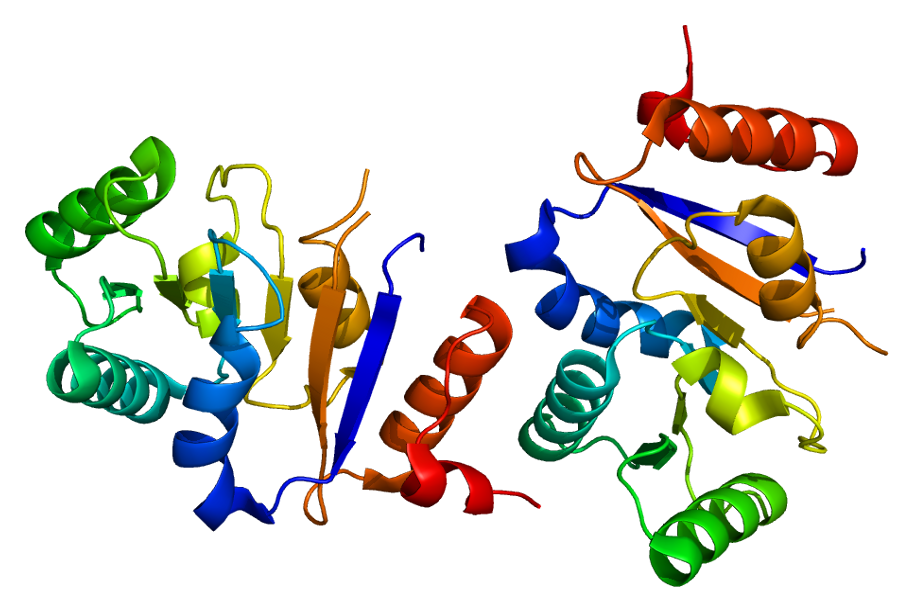

Identifiers
- Aliases: DDX41, ABS, MPLPF, DEAD-box helicase 41
- External IDs: OMIM: 608170; MGI: 1920185; GeneCards: DDX41
Available structures
PDB	Ortholog search: PDBe RCSB
PDB	List of PDB id codes 2P6N, 5GVR, 5H1Y, 5GVS, 8C6J
Enzyme activity
EC #	BRENDA	ExPASy	KEGG	MetaCyc
3.6.4.13	↗	↗	↗	↗

Gene location (Human)
Chr.	Chromosome 5 (human)
Band	5q35.3	Start	177,511,577 bp
Band	5q35.3	End	177,516,961 bp

Gene location (Mouse)
Chr.	Chromosome 13 (mouse)
Band	13|13 B1	Start	55,678,223 bp
Band	13|13 B1	End	55,684,471 bp
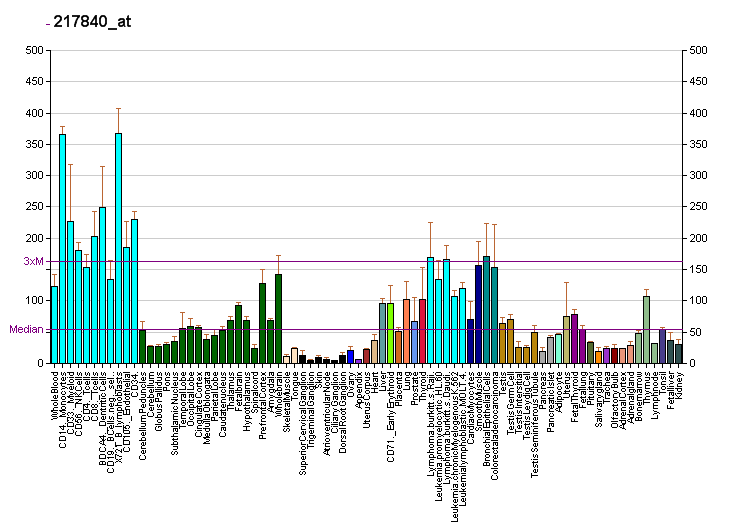
RNA expression pattern
Bgee	Human / Mouse (ortholog); Top expressed in: granulocyte; right frontal lobe; anterior cingulate cortex; sural nerve; mucosa of transverse colon; right hemisphere of cerebellum; stromal cell of endometrium; prefrontal cortex; nucleus accumbens; monocyte / Top expressed in: primitive streak; right kidney; proximal tubule; granulocyte; spermatocyte; embryo; ventricular zone; epiblast; embryo; neural layer of retina; More reference expression data
BioGPS	More reference expression data
Gene ontology
Molecular function	DNA binding; nucleotide binding; helicase activity; metal ion binding; protein binding; nucleic acid binding; hydrolase activity; ATP binding; RNA binding
Cellular component	cytosol; catalytic step 2 spliceosome; membrane; endoplasmic reticulum; nucleus; spliceosomal complex; nucleolus; cytoplasm
Biological process	cellular response to interferon-beta; mRNA processing; regulation of type I interferon production; defense response to virus; RNA secondary structure unwinding; RNA splicing; positive regulation of type I interferon production; positive regulation of transcription by RNA polymerase II; apoptotic process; mRNA splicing, via spliceosome; cell population proliferation; cell differentiation
Sources:Amigo / QuickGO
Orthologs
Databases	NCBI: entry; OMA: entry
Species	Human	Mouse
Entrez	51428	72935
Ensembl	ENSG00000183258	ENSMUSG00000021494
UniProt	Q9UJV9	Q91VN6
RefSeq (mRNA)	NM_016222; NM_001321732; NM_001321830	NM_134059
RefSeq (protein)	NP_001308661; NP_001308759; NP_057306	NP_598820
Location (UCSC)	Chr 5: 177.51 – 177.52 Mb	Chr 13: 55.68 – 55.68 Mb
PubMed search
- Wikidata
View/Edit Human	View/Edit Mouse

Probable ATP-dependent RNA helicase DDX41 is an enzyme that in humans is encoded by the DDX41 gene.

DEAD box proteins, characterized by the conserved motif Asp-Glu-Ala-Asp (DEAD), are putative RNA helicases. They are implicated in a number of cellular processes involving alteration of RNA secondary structure, such as translation initiation, nuclear and mitochondrial splicing, and ribosome and spliceosome assembly. Based on their distribution patterns, some members of the DEAD box protein family are believed to be involved in embryogenesis, spermatogenesis, and cellular growth and division. This gene encodes a member of this family. The function of this member has not been determined. Based on studies in Drosophila, the gene is widely required during post-transcriptional gene expression. Germ line DDX41 mutations define a unique subtype of myeloid neoplasms.

== Function ==
DDX41 is believed to take part in several cell functions. It is mainly concentrated in the nucleus of the cell, but it can also be expressed in the cytoplasm. In the cytoplasm it takes part in the Interferon I production pathway by recognizing foreign cytoplasmic DNA and signaling STING. It has been observed that hypomorphic DDX41 mutations impair the immune system response to viral and bacterial infections. In the nucleus, DDX41 is believed to regulate the transcriptional elongation process signaling Pol II to slow down the elongation while the splicing process is taking place. Under-expression and inhibition of DDX41 have been shown to lead to the formation of an R-loop which results in transcriptional errors with no specific patterns. DDX41 is also believed to take part in the ribosome biogenesis process, given its implications in the processing of snoRNA.

It has been shown that DDX41 germ-line mutations are associated with myelodysplastic syndrome and acute myeloid leukemia.
