= ENPP3 =

Protein-coding gene in the species Homo sapiens

Identifiers
- Aliases: ENPP3, B10, CD203c, NPP3, PD-IBETA, PDNP3, ectonucleotide pyrophosphatase/phosphodiesterase 3
- External IDs: OMIM: 602182; MGI: 2143702; GeneCards: ENPP3
Enzyme activity
| EC # | BRENDA | ExPASy | KEGG | MetaCyc |
|---|---|---|---|---|
| 3.1.4.1 | ↗ | ↗ | ↗ | ↗ |
| 3.6.1.9 | ↗ | ↗ | ↗ | ↗ |

Gene location (Human)
| Chr. | Chromosome 6 (human) |
| Band | 6q23.2 | Start | 131,628,442 bp |
| Band | 6q23.2 | End | 131,747,418 bp |

Gene location (Mouse)
| Chr. | Chromosome 10 (mouse) |
| Band | 10|10 A4 | Start | 24,648,304 bp |
| Band | 10|10 A4 | End | 24,718,721 bp |
RNA expression pattern
| Bgee | Human / Mouse (ortholog); Top expressed in: jejunal mucosa; mucosa of ileum; seminal vesicula; duodenum; mucosa of paranasal sinus; bronchial epithelial cell; endometrium; buccal mucosa cell; tibialis anterior muscle; olfactory zone of nasal mucosa / Top expressed in: epithelium of small intestine; conjunctival fornix; intestinal villus; duodenum; parotid gland; lacrimal gland; cornea; jejunum; ciliary body; left lobe of liver; More reference expression data |
| BioGPS | n/a |
Gene ontology
| Molecular function | nucleoside-triphosphate diphosphatase activity; nucleotide diphosphatase activity; phosphodiesterase I activity; polysaccharide binding; metal ion binding; scavenger receptor activity; NADH pyrophosphatase activity; catalytic activity; nucleic acid binding; hydrolase activity; calcium ion binding; zinc ion binding |
| Cellular component | integral component of membrane; membrane; integral component of plasma membrane; extracellular region; perinuclear region of cytoplasm; extracellular exosome; plasma membrane; external side of plasma membrane; apical plasma membrane |
| Biological process | nucleoside triphosphate catabolic process; receptor-mediated endocytosis; immune response; phosphate-containing compound metabolic process; metabolism; inorganic diphosphate transport; nucleic acid phosphodiester bond hydrolysis; basophil activation involved in immune response; pyrimidine nucleotide metabolic process; negative regulation of mast cell activation involved in immune response; ATP metabolic process; negative regulation of inflammatory response; negative regulation of mast cell proliferation; vesicle-mediated transport; endocytosis |
Sources:Amigo / QuickGO
Orthologs
| Databases | NCBI: entry; OMA: entry |
| Species | Human | Mouse |
| Entrez | 5169 | 209558 |
| Ensembl | ENSG00000154269 | ENSMUSG00000019989 |
| UniProt | O14638 | Q6DYE8 |
| RefSeq (mRNA) | NM_005021 | NM_134005; NM_145372 |
| RefSeq (protein) | NP_005012 | NP_598766 |
| Location (UCSC) | Chr 6: 131.63 – 131.75 Mb | Chr 10: 24.65 – 24.72 Mb |
| PubMed search |
- Wikidata
| View/Edit Human | View/Edit Mouse |

Ectonucleotide pyrophosphatase/phosphodiesterase family member 3 is an enzyme that in humans is encoded by the ENPP3 gene.

== Function ==
The protein encoded by this gene belongs to a series of ectoenzymes that are involved in hydrolysis of extracellular nucleotides. These ectoenzymes possess ATPase and ATP pyrophosphatase activities and are type II transmembrane proteins. Expression of the related rat mRNA has been found in a subset of immature glial cells and in the alimentary tract. The corresponding rat protein has been detected in the pancreas, small intestine, colon, and liver. The human mRNA is expressed in glioma cells, prostate, and uterus. Expression of the human protein has been detected in uterus, basophils, and mast cells.

This protein has also been used in conjunction with CD63 as a marker for activated basophils in the Basophil Activation Test for IgE mediated allergic reactions.

ENPP3 hydrolyzes the immunomodulatory second messenger extracellular cyclic GMP-AMP (cGAMP), a signaling molecule that activates the STING pathway. Along with its paralog ENPP1, ENPP3 helps control extracellular cGAMP levels and accounts for the cGAMP hydrolysis observed when ENPP1 is absent. By limiting the amount of extracellular cGAMP available to activate STING, ENPP3 can dampen immune signaling and function as an innate immune checkpoint.
