= Cyclic GMP-AMP synthase =

Class of enzyme

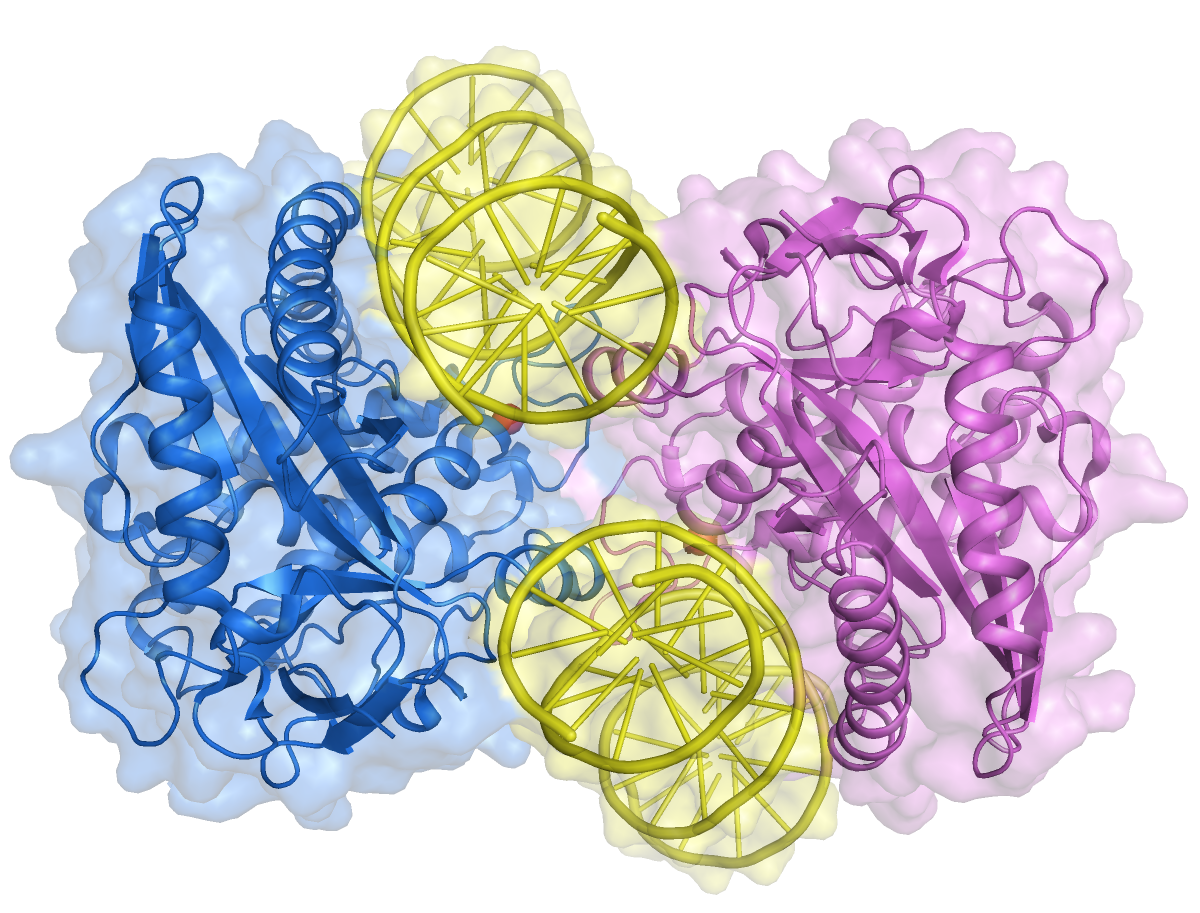
- cGAS complexed with dsDNA (based on PDB 4O6A)

Identifiers
- EC no.: 2.7.7.86

Databases
- BRENDA: enzyme data
- ExPASy: NiceZyme view
- KEGG: enzyme entry
- MetaCyc: metabolic pathway
- Rhea: reactions
- PDB structures: RCSB PDB PDBe PDBsum
Search
- PMC: articles
- PubMed: articles
- NCBI: proteins

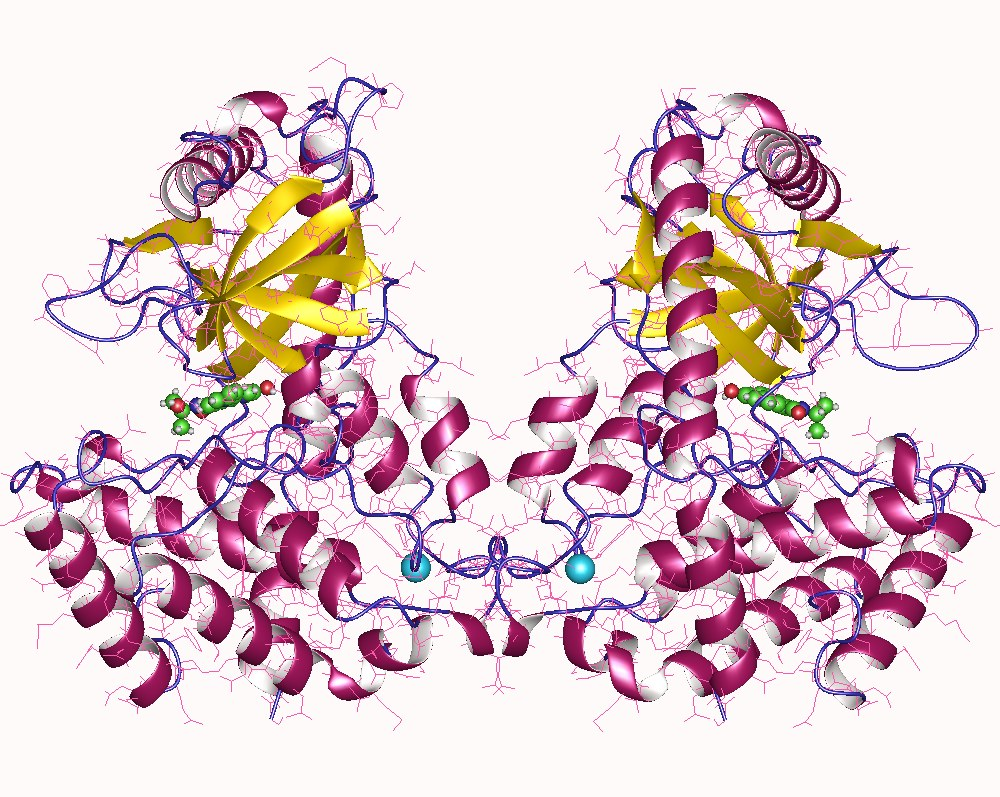
cGAS dimer, human

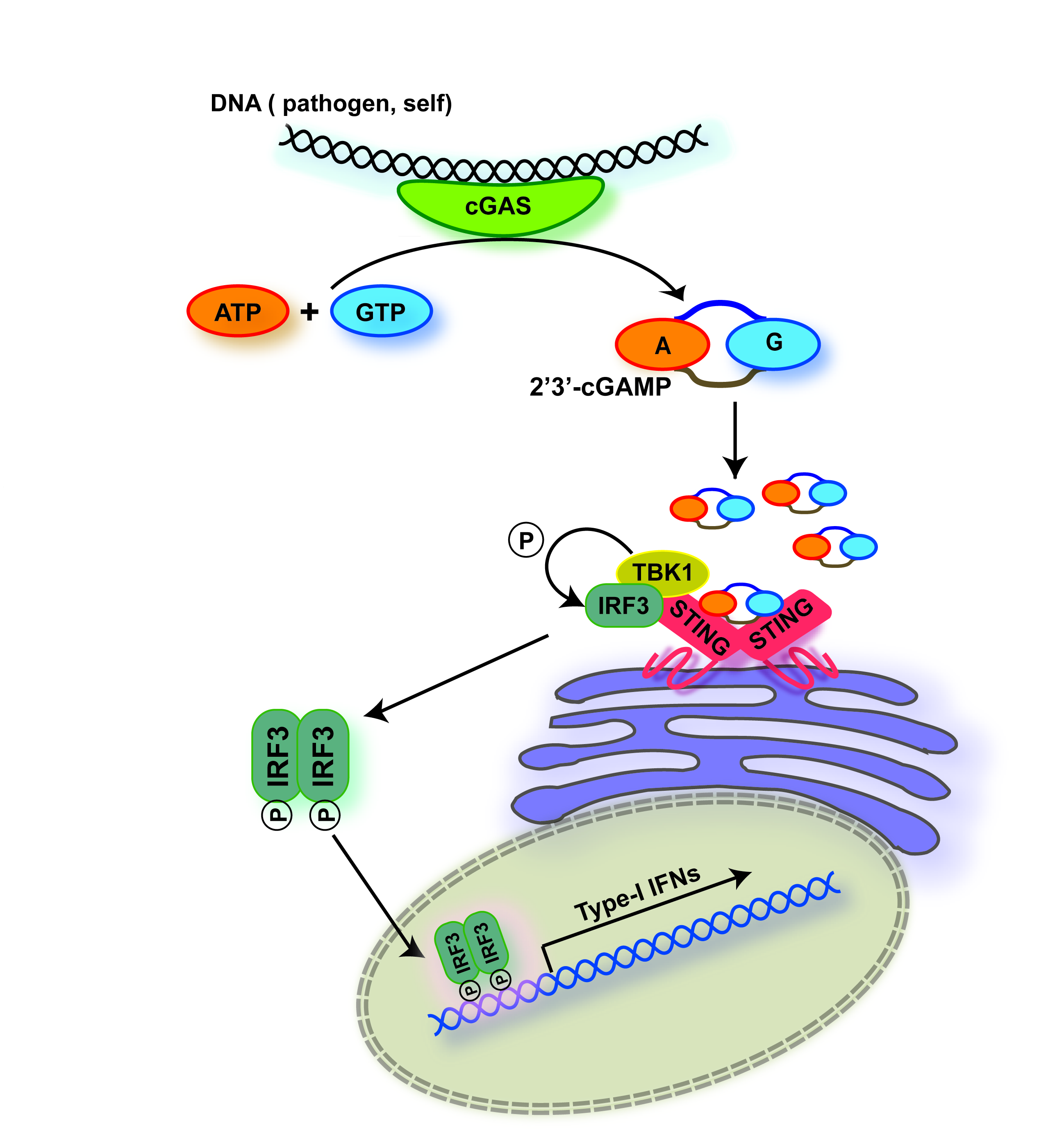
cGAS-cGAMP-STING pathway

Cyclic GMP-AMP synthases (cGAS, cGAMP synthase), are a class of enzyme. They belongs to the nucleotidyltransferase family, and are part of the cytosolic DNA sensor that activates a type-I interferon response (the cGAS-STING DNA sensing pathway). It binds to microbial DNA as well as self DNA that invades the cytoplasm, and catalyzes cGAMP synthesis. In humans, this enzyme is encoded by the gene CGAS, while in some insects this activity has been found in the proteins encoded by genes cGLR1 or cGLR2.

== Function ==
The enzyme catalyses a chemical reaction that produces a specific isomer of cyclic guanosine monophosphate–adenosine monophosphate (cGAMP) from the components guanosine triphosphate (GTP) and adenosine triphosphate (ATP), with two units of pyrophosphate (PP_{i}) as a byproduct:

guanosine triphosphate
+
adenosine triphosphate
2 PP_{i}
cGAMP

The cyclic product has a bond between the 2'-OH of GMP and the 5'-phosphate of AMP and another between the 3'-OH of AMP and 5'-phosphate of GMP. This cGAMP is a second messenger that binds to and activates the endoplasmic reticulum protein STING to trigger type-I IFNs production. Mice lacking cGAS are more vulnerable to lethal infection by DNA viruses and RNA viruses. In addition, cGAS has been shown to be an innate immune sensor of retroviruses including HIV.

Human cGAS has been shown to produce less 2'3' cGAMP than mouse cGAS. This difference can be explained by the structural differences between mcGAS and hcGAS. Human cGAS is activated in a strongly DNA length-dependent manner. Indeed, human cGAS exhibits a higher affinity for DNA fragments of over 45 bp, whereas mouse cGAS is preferentially activated by shorter DNA sequences. Two amino acids, K187 and L195 in the N-terminus of hcGAS, have been shown to be responsible for human-specific control of 2'3' cGAMP synthesis. The opposing responses of hcGAS and mcGAS to short DNA are completely reversed by the human-specific K187/L195 substitution.
