= Tilorone =

Chemical compound

Clinical data
- AHFS/Drugs.com: International Drug Names
- Routes of administration: By mouth (tablets)
- ATC code: J05AX19 (WHO)

Pharmacokinetic data
- Bioavailability: 60%
- Protein binding: ~80%
- Metabolism: Nil
- Elimination half-life: 48 hours
- Excretion: Feces (70%), urine (9%)

Identifiers
- IUPAC name: 2,7-Bis(2-diethylaminoethoxy)fluoren-9-one
- CAS Number: 27591-97-5
- PubChem CID: 5475
- ChemSpider: 5276
- UNII: O6W7VEW6KS
- KEGG: D06149
- ChEBI: CHEBI:147347
- ChEMBL: ChEMBL47298
- CompTox Dashboard (EPA): DTXSID1045958

Chemical and physical data
- Formula: C_{25}H_{34}N_{2}O_{3}
- Molar mass: 410.558 g·mol^{−1}
- 3D model (JSmol): Interactive image
- SMILES: CCN(CC)CCOc1ccc-2c(c1)C(=O)c3c2ccc(c3)OCCN(CC)CC
- InChI: InChI=1S/C25H34N2O3/c1-5-26(6-2)13-15-29-19-9-11-21-22-12-10-20(30-16-14-27(7-3)8-4)18-24(22)25(28)23(21)17-19/h9-12,17-18H,5-8,13-16H2,1-4H3; Key:MPMFCABZENCRHV-UHFFFAOYSA-N

Tilorone (trade names Amixin, Lavomax and others) is the first recognized synthetic, small molecular weight compound that is an orally active interferon inducer. It is used as an antiviral drug in some countries which do not require double-blind placebo-controlled studies, including Russia. It is effective against Ebola virus in mice. It shows activity against Eastern equine encephalitis and related viruses.

== Pharmacology ==
Tilorone activates the production of interferon.

== See also ==
- Cyclic adenosine-inosine monophosphate
