= H-151 =

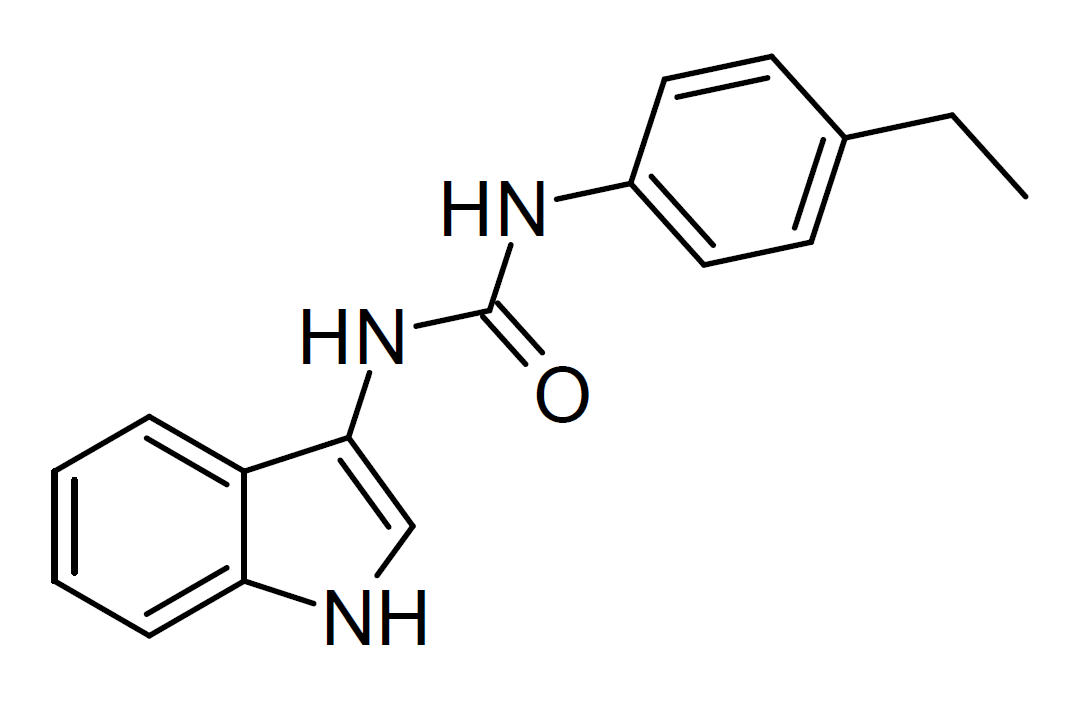

Identifiers
- IUPAC name: 1-(4-ethylphenyl)-3-(1H-indol-3-yl)urea
- CAS Number: 941987-60-6
- PubChem CID: 7616033
- IUPHAR/BPS: 10122
- ChemSpider: 5932234
- ChEMBL: ChEMBL5179819

Chemical and physical data
- Formula: C_{17}H_{17}N_{3}O
- Molar mass: 279.343 g·mol^{−1}
- 3D model (JSmol): Interactive image
- SMILES: CCC1=CC=C(C=C1)NC(=O)NC2=CNC3=CC=CC=C32
- InChI: InChI=1S/C17H17N3O/c1-2-12-7-9-13(10-8-12)19-17(21)20-16-11-18-15-6-4-3-5-14(15)16/h3-11,18H,2H2,1H3,(H2,19,20,21); Key:UJZDIKVQFMCLBE-UHFFFAOYSA-N

H-151 is an experimental drug which acts as an irreversible antagonist of the stimulator of interferon genes (STING) protein. It has antiinflammatory and antiviral effects by reducing cytokine signalling, and has potential application in numerous disease states in which inflammation plays a role.

== See also ==
- SN-011
- STING-IN-2
