= LRRC8E =

Protein-coding gene in the species Homo sapiens

Identifiers
- Aliases: LRRC8E, leucine rich repeat containing 8 family member E, leucine rich repeat containing 8 VRAC subunit E
- External IDs: OMIM: 612891; MGI: 1919517; GeneCards: LRRC8E

Gene location (Human)
Chr.	Chromosome 19 (human)
Band	19p13.2	Start	7,888,505 bp
Band	19p13.2	End	7,902,021 bp

Gene location (Mouse)
Chr.	Chromosome 8 (mouse)
Band	8|8 A1.1	Start	4,276,827 bp
Band	8|8 A1.1	End	4,287,470 bp
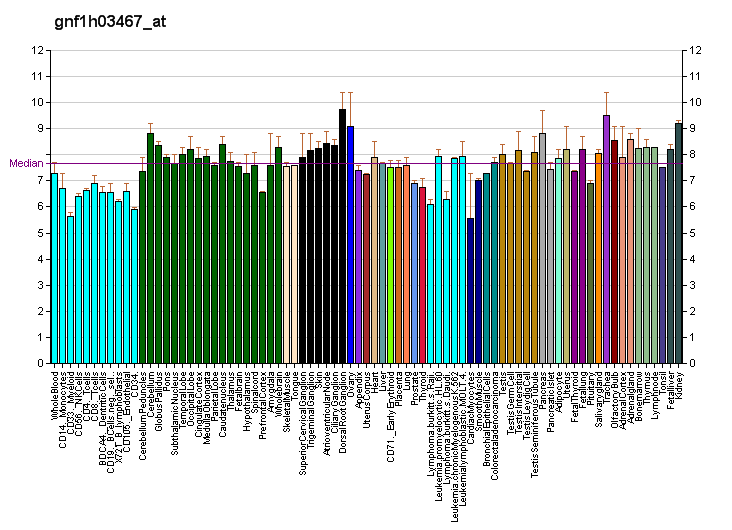
RNA expression pattern
Bgee	Human / Mouse (ortholog); Top expressed in: secondary oocyte; gingival epithelium; testicle; skin of leg; parotid gland; olfactory zone of nasal mucosa; gonad; skin of abdomen; buccal mucosa cell; stromal cell of endometrium / Top expressed in: primary oocyte; transitional epithelium of urinary bladder; secondary oocyte; zygote; lip; seminal vesicula; otolith organ; epithelium of stomach; utricle; molar; More reference expression data
BioGPS	More reference expression data
Gene ontology
Molecular function	protein binding; volume-sensitive anion channel activity
Cellular component	cytoplasm; integral component of membrane; integral component of plasma membrane; membrane; endoplasmic reticulum membrane; endoplasmic reticulum; plasma membrane; ion channel complex
Biological process	ion transport; signal transduction; transmembrane transport; inorganic anion transport; cell volume homeostasis; anion transmembrane transport; aspartate transmembrane transport; cellular response to osmotic stress
Sources:Amigo / QuickGO
Orthologs
Databases	NCBI: entry; OMA: entry
Species	Human	Mouse
Entrez	80131	72267
Ensembl	ENSG00000171017	ENSMUSG00000046589
UniProt	Q6NSJ5	Q66JT1
RefSeq (mRNA)	NM_001268284; NM_001268285; NM_025061	NM_028175
RefSeq (protein)	NP_001255213; NP_001255214; NP_079337	NP_082451
Location (UCSC)	Chr 19: 7.89 – 7.9 Mb	Chr 8: 4.28 – 4.29 Mb
PubMed search
- Wikidata
View/Edit Human	View/Edit Mouse

Leucine-rich repeat-containing protein 8E is a protein that in humans is encoded by the LRRC8E gene. Researchers have found out that this protein, along with the other LRRC8 proteins LRRC8A, LRRC8B, LRRC8C, and LRRC8D, is sometimes a subunit of the heteromer protein volume-regulated anion channel. Volume-Regulated Anion Channels (VRACs) are crucial to the regulation of cell size by transporting chloride ions and various organic osmolytes, such as taurine or glutamate, across the plasma membrane, and that is not the only function these channels have been linked to.

While LRRC8E is one of many proteins that can be part of VRAC, research has found that it is not as crucial to the activity of the channel in comparison to LRRC8A and LRRC8D. However, while we know that LRRC8A and LRRC8D are necessary for VRAC function, other studies have found that they are not sufficient for the full range of usual VRAC activity. This is where the other LRRC8 proteins come in, such as LRRC8E, as the different composition of these subunits affects the range of specificity for VRACs.

In addition to its role in VRACs, the LRRC8 protein family is also associated with agammaglobulinemia-5.

Specifically for LRRC8E, there has been a recent study that found that this gene was nominally associated with panic disorder.
