= Volume-regulated anion channel =

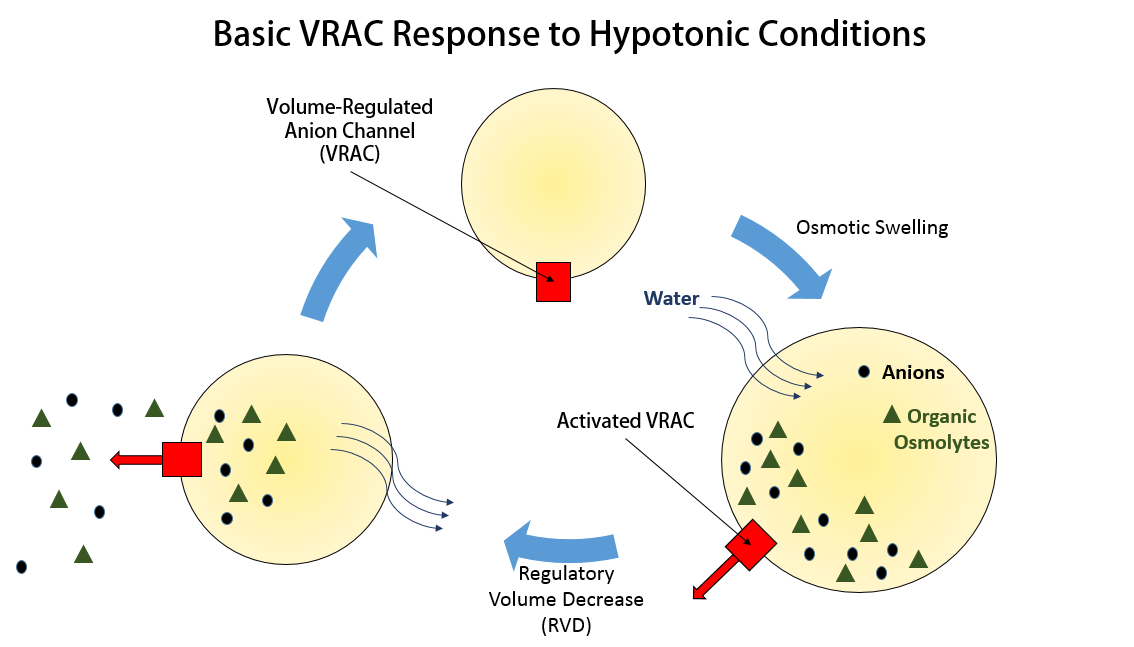
Basic role of VRAC in RVD and Cell Apoptosis. This model is simplistic as it does not account for different LRRC8 protein subunits that make up the VRACs. It has been determined by Planells-Cases et al. that different subunit composition allows for specificity of VRACs (2015). This shown process is for RVD, but VRAC is also active in the observed cell shrinkage that occurs before apoptosis through the same release of anions and organic osmolytes.

Volume-regulated anion channels (VRACs) are crucial to the regulation of cell size by transporting chloride ions and various organic osmolytes, such as taurine or glutamate, across the plasma membrane, and that is not the only function these channels have been linked to. Some research has also suggested that VRACs may be water-permeable as well.

The regulation of cell volume is necessary not only as a prevention against swelling or shrinkage caused by a change in the cell's environment, but also throughout all stages of a cell's life. The changing of a cell's volume, whether it be swelling or shrinkage, generally occurs without major changes, such as exocytic insertion or endocytic retrieval of the plasma membrane. Instead, volume regulation mostly occurs through the transport of potassium, sodium, chloride, and organic osmolytes across the membrane. The ramifications of cells not being able to regulate their volume size in relation to their environments are great as swelling leads to lysis, and shrinking eventually leads from dehydration to apoptosis. The specific role that VRACs play in the regulation of cell volume specifically is regulatory volume decrease (RVD) of cells.

Research of VRACs has led some to conclude that they are widely expressed in mammalian cells and that they may even be ubiquitously expressed. VRACs have also been shown to participate in fundamental cellular processes other than basic volume regulation, such as cell proliferation, migration, and apoptosis.

== Structure and mechanism ==
Although the scientific community has known about VRACs for a long time, it was only recently discovered what the molecular composition of the channels is. They are composed of LRRC8 protein heteromers, of which there are five variations. However, the specific composition of LRRC8A, LRRC8B, LRRC8C, LRRC8D, and LRRC8E necessary for a properly functioning VRAC are unknown. LRRC8A alone can form a hexameric VRAC, for which the cyro-EM structure has been determined in its mice and human versions.

Research has also shown that variations in the composition of the subunits leads to variations in the ability of VRACs to transport certain metabolites. For instance, the subunit LRRC8D being involved in the composition of VRAC has been highly associated with the transport of taurine along with specific anti-cancer drugs. Because of experiments like this, we know that it is likely that LRRC8 proteins create the VRAC pore as well.

As for a mechanism for VRACs, recent research has suggested that they are activated when there is a reduction of intracellular ionic strength, which implies that VRACs may also act as sensors as well as affecters of cell volume regulation. However, researchers have not been able to find any intracellular signaling mechanisms that play a dominant role in VRAC activation.

The transmembrane portion of LRRC8 proteins are similar to those in Pannexins.

== Roles in neurons ==
VRACs are crucial for transport of not only chloride, but also taurine, glutamate, and aspartate. These organic osmolytes are important for more than cellular volume regulation as they are also very crucial for extracellular signaling. To set the stage for VRACs role in extracellular signaling, we must discuss some consequences that the release of glutamate and taurine from VRACs has on surrounding neurons respectively.

For glutamate, when excitatory neurotransmitters are released and activates channels on surrounding neurons, it results in overactive depolarization, and increase in calcium ions, and eventually cellular apoptosis. This is generally called excitotoxicity, and it normally results in neuronal swelling. VRACs' release of organic osmolytes as a response to this swelling and influx of ions most likely aids in the prevention of the neuron from bursting, as the release of inorganic compounds from a cell has only been associated with a cellular volume decrease of about 20-30%. Yet, in addition to the prevention of lysis for the neuron, the release of taurine and glutamate will also continue to propagate the excitotoxicity effect on neighboring neurons. The most relevant cells to study regarding VRACs role and reaction to excitotoxicity are astrocytes. This is because of their role as supporters of neuronal communication in the brain, the fact that they have been proven to contain VRACs, and the fact that they have been found in a swollen condition in response to pathologies regarding excitotoxicity. As we have stated, the increase of stimulation on a neuron results in excitotoxicity, and glutamate is one of the neurotransmitters that in excess could cause this neuronal response. There are many pathologies attributed to this cellular response including stroke and hypoglycemia among others. As an example, a few studies have found that astrocytes cellular VRAC activation might be associated with stroke-related increases in substances like ATP. Experiments have found that VRAC inhibitors were able to decrease the stroke-related release of excitatory neurotransmitters in the brain; which means that VRACs are likely activated by the increase of cellular ATP and other molecules in astrocytes, and the release of glutamate by these cells causes the neurons around them to become depolarized, increase their calcium ion concentration, and undergo apoptosis.

The other organic osmolyte associated with VRACs, taurine, also has many extracellular signaling functions. Specifically, it is thought that the release of taurine from glia by VRACs is linked to systemic volume regulation in the osmosensing supraoptical nucleus (SON). At first, researchers thought that neurons found in SON were not able to undergo RVD, but it was later found that they do eventually develop a chloride ion current after a certain amount of time. Astrocytes were again studied in relation to this discovery, and they found that the cells readily respond to a hypertonic environment by releasing taurine through VRAC-like channels. In turn, the taurine activates glycine receptor chloride channels on neighboring SON neurons, which causes them to hyperpolarize. Since the SON neurons shrink and depolarize in a hypertonic environment, this interaction between the astrocytes acts as an inhibitor of the secretion of vasopressin by SON.

Based on these studies conducted on VRACs role in both excitotoxicity conditions and the regulation of the osmosensing supraoptical nucleus (SON), there are large implications for the actual influence this channel has on everyday neuronal activity. It is likely that VRACs play a lot of major parts in neuronal regulation; however, it is difficult for researchers to narrow down the scope of their effects. Another important aspect of neurons to keep in mind is that potassium, chloride cotransporters (KCCs) are other proteins that are also part of the RVD process and are activated when cells undergo swelling. This is important to keep in mind because VRACs are not the only molecules present that aid in cell volume regulation, and recent research has shown that the likelihood that these two channels work cooperatively is high.

== Medical connections ==
In addition to the connections presented in the discussion of VRACs’ many roles in neurons, research has shown that cell shrinkage largely precedes cell death (known as AVD – apoptotic volume decrease), and there has been research that has shown that VRACs plays a role in this process. It is likely that cell shrinkage inhibition is linked with inhibitors of VRACs or with the general disruption of LRRC8 proteins. This inhibition or disruption ultimately leads to suppressed drug-induced apoptosis. Therefore, VRACs could play a role in drug resistance in certain types of cancer.

A research paper in December 2024 described a genetic disorder (a "syndrome") caused by genetic variants in the gene LRRC8C that produce constitutional activation of VRACs. The clinical manifestations in the two unrelated affected children are manifold, suggesting that VRACs may have many different roles in different cell types. It is hoped that the study of this genetic disease ("TIMES syndrome"; see OMIM https://omim.org/entry/621056) may lead to increased understanding of the physiologic functions of VRACs and perhaps also to pharmacological modulation.

== Related genes ==
- LRRC8A
- LRRC8B
- LRRC8C
- LRRC8D
- LRRC8E
