= Cyclic guanosine monophosphate–adenosine monophosphate =

Chemical compound

Names
- Other names cGAMP; cyclic GMP-AMP; cGAMP(2'-5'); cyclic Gp(2'-5')Ap(3'-5')

Identifiers
CAS Number	849214-04-6
3D model (JSmol)	Interactive image
ChEBI	CHEBI:75947
ChEMBL	ChEMBL4449584
ChemSpider	30785740
KEGG	C20640
PubChem CID	135471108
UNII	552Y49K43E
- InChI: InChI=1S/C20H24N10O13P2/c21-14-8-15(24-3-23-14)29(4-25-8)18-10(31)12-6(40-18)1-38-45(36,37)43-13-7(2-39-44(34,35)42-12)41-19(11(13)32)30-5-26-9-16(30)27-20(22)28-17(9)33/h3-7,10-13,18-19,31-32H,1-2H2,(H,34,35)(H,36,37)(H2,21,23,24)(H3,22,27,28,33)/t6-,7-,10-,11-,12-,13-,18-,19-/m1/s1 Key: RFCBNSCSPXMEBK-INFSMZHSSA-N
- SMILES: C1[C@@H]2[C@H]([C@H]([C@@H](O2)N3C=NC4=C3NC(=NC4=O)N)OP(=O)(OC[C@@H]5[C@H]([C@H]([C@@H](O5)N6C=NC7=C6N=CN=C7N)O)OP(=O)(O1)O)O)O

Properties
Chemical formula	C_{20}H_{24}N_{10}O_{13}P_{2}
Molar mass	674.417 g·mol^{−1}
- Except where otherwise noted, data are given for materials in their standard state (at 25 °C [77 °F], 100 kPa). Infobox references

Cyclic guanosine monophosphate–adenosine monophosphate (cyclic GMP-AMP, cGAMP) is the first cyclic di-nucleotide found in metazoa. In mammalian cells, cGAMP is synthesized by cyclic GMP-AMP synthase (cGAS) from ATP and GTP upon cytosolic DNA stimulation.

== Biosynthesis and function ==
The enzyme cyclic GMP-AMP synthase catalyses a chemical reaction that produces a specific isomer of cyclic guanosine monophosphate–adenosine monophosphate (cGAMP) from the components guanosine triphosphate (GTP) and adenosine triphosphate (ATP), with two units of pyrophosphate (PP_{i}) as a byproduct:

guanosine triphosphate
+
adenosine triphosphate
2 PP_{i}
cGAMP

The cyclic product has a bond between the 2'-OH of GMP and the 5'-phosphate of AMP and another between the 3'-OH of AMP and 5'-phosphate of GMP. This molecule, referred to as 2′3′-cGAMP (cyclic [G(2',5')pA(3',5')p]), functions as an endogenous second messenger inducing STING-dependent type I interferon response. cGAMP has also been shown to be an effective adjuvant that boosts the production of antigen-specific antibodies and T cell responses in mice. cGAMP exercises antiviral functions in the cell where it is produced, but can also transfer to neighboring cells through gap junctions. It may even be packaged into lentivirus (such as HIV-1), poxvirus and herpes virus, and under cell culture conditions has been found to transmit an antiviral signal to the cells infected with these viruses; however, there is reason to think that at least HIV is capable of evading this mechanism by some means. cGAMP can also be exported into the extracellular space, where it can act as an intercellular signaling molecule. Export is at least partly mediated by the ATP-binding cassette transporter ABCC1, which transports cGAMP directly in an ATP-dependent manner. Additional export mechanisms remain to be identified. Extracellular cGAMP can be imported into cells by several transporters and channels, including SLC19A1, SLC46A2, and LRRC8 channels. Extracellular cGAMP is hydrolyzed primarily by ENPP1, with its paralog ENPP3 also contributing to cGAMP degradation.

cGAMP signalling has been identified in prokaryotes including Vibrio cholerae which express a bacterial analogue of cGAS. In these organisms, cGAS is encoded as part of an operon alongside cGAMP-activated phospholipases (e.g. CapV in V. cholerae). During infection by bacteriophage, cGAS is activated and cGAMP is synthesised, activating CapV which degrades the cell's membrane and triggers cell death before the phage can complete its replicatory cycle.
