= Stimulator of interferon genes =

Protein-coding gene in the species Homo sapiens

STING1
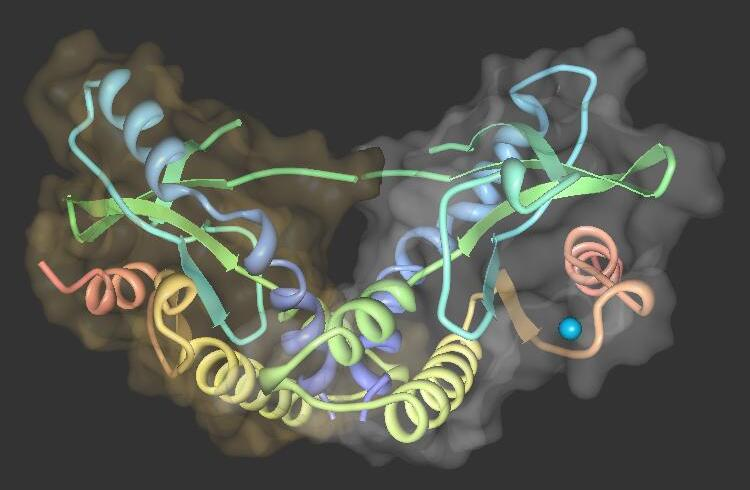

Identifiers
- Aliases: STING1, ERIS, MITA, MPYS, NET23, SAVI, STING, hMITA, hSTING, Stimulator of interferon genes, transmembrane protein 173, STING-beta, TMEM173, stimulator of interferon response cGAMP interactor 1
- External IDs: OMIM: 612374; MGI: 1919762; GeneCards: STING1
Available structures
PDB	Ortholog search: PDBe RCSB
PDB	List of PDB id codes 4EF4, 4EF5, 4EMT, 4EMU, 4F5D, 4F5E, 4F5W, 4F5Y, 4F9E, 4F9G, 4KSY, 4LOH, 4LOI, 4QXO, 4QXP, 4QXQ, 4QXR, 5BQX, 5JEJ

Gene location (Human)
Chr.	Chromosome 5 (human)
Band	5q31.2	Start	139,475,533 bp
Band	5q31.2	End	139,482,935 bp

Gene location (Mouse)
Chr.	Chromosome 18 (mouse)
Band	18 B2|18	Start	35,866,732 bp
Band	18 B2|18	End	35,873,607 bp
RNA expression pattern
Bgee	Human / Mouse (ortholog); Top expressed in: right uterine tube; olfactory zone of nasal mucosa; granulocyte; gastric mucosa; right coronary artery; upper lobe of left lung; Descending thoracic aorta; left uterine tube; apex of heart; ascending aorta / Top expressed in: lumbar spinal ganglion; mesenteric lymph nodes; endothelial cell of lymphatic vessel; interventricular septum; spleen; tail of embryo; blood; thymus; cervix; internal carotid artery; More reference expression data
BioGPS	n/a
Gene ontology
Molecular function	nucleotide binding; cyclic-di-GMP binding; protein homodimerization activity; transcription factor binding; protein binding; identical protein binding; protein kinase binding; ubiquitin protein ligase binding; 2',3'-cyclic GMP-AMP binding
Cellular component	cytoplasm; integral component of membrane; Golgi apparatus; endoplasmic reticulum membrane; membrane; peroxisome; mitochondrial outer membrane; mitochondrion; endoplasmic reticulum; perinuclear region of cytoplasm; cytoplasmic vesicle membrane; plasma membrane; secretory granule membrane
Biological process	interferon-beta production; cellular response to interferon-beta; immune system process; regulation of type I interferon production; defense response to virus; cellular response to exogenous dsRNA; activation of innate immune response; positive regulation of protein binding; positive regulation of transcription by RNA polymerase II; positive regulation of defense response to virus by host; apoptotic process; innate immune response; neutrophil degranulation; cellular response to organic cyclic compound; viral process; positive regulation of DNA-binding transcription factor activity; positive regulation of type I interferon production; regulation of gene expression; regulation of cellular metabolic process; regulation of inflammatory response; cytoplasmic pattern recognition receptor signaling pathway in response to virus
Sources:Amigo / QuickGO
Orthologs
Databases	NCBI: entry; OMA: entry
Species	Human	Mouse
Entrez	340061	72512
Ensembl	ENSG00000184584; ENSG00000288243	ENSMUSG00000024349
UniProt	Q86WV6	Q3TBT3
RefSeq (mRNA)	NM_001301738; NM_198282; NM_001367258	NM_001289591; NM_001289592; NM_028261
RefSeq (protein)	NP_001288667; NP_938023; NP_001354187	NP_001276520; NP_001276521; NP_082537
Location (UCSC)	Chr 5: 139.48 – 139.48 Mb	Chr 18: 35.87 – 35.87 Mb
PubMed search
- Wikidata
View/Edit Human	View/Edit Mouse

Stimulator of interferon genes (STING), also known as transmembrane protein 173 (TMEM173) and MPYS/MITA/ERIS is a regulator protein that in humans is encoded by the STING1 gene.

STING plays an important role in innate immunity. STING induces type I interferon production when cells are infected with intracellular pathogens, such as viruses, mycobacteria and intracellular parasites. Type I interferon, mediated by STING, protects infected cells and nearby cells from local infection by binding to the same cell that secretes it (autocrine signaling) and nearby cells (paracrine signaling.) It thus plays an important role, for instance, in controlling norovirus infection.

STING works as both a direct cytosolic DNA sensor (CDS) and an adaptor protein in Type I interferon signaling through different molecular mechanisms. It has been shown to activate downstream transcription factors STAT6 and IRF3 through TBK1, which are responsible for antiviral response and innate immune response against intracellular pathogen.

== Structure ==
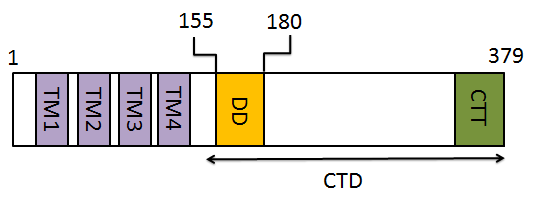
Human STING Protein Architecture

Amino acids 1–379 of human STING include the 4 transmembrane regions (TMs) and a C-terminal domain. The C-terminal domain (CTD: amino acids 138–379) contains the dimerization domain (DD) and the carboxy-terminal tail (CTT: amino acids 340–379).

The STING forms a symmetrical dimer in the cell. STING dimer resembles a butterfly, with a deep cleft between the two protomers. The hydrophobic residues from each STING protomer form hydrophobic interactions between each other at the interface.

STING dimers can further assemble into higher-order linear polymers upon ligand binding. cGAMP-induced release of the C-terminal tail exposes polymerization interface between adjacent dimers, allowing formation of disulfide-linked polymers that are required for STING activation. Some disease-associated hyperactive STING variants.

== Expression ==
STING is expressed in hematopoietic cells in peripheral lymphoid tissues, including T lymphocytes, NK cells, myeloid cells and monocytes. It has also been shown that STING is highly expressed in lung, ovary, heart, smooth muscle, retina, bone marrow and vagina.

== Localization ==
The subcellular localization of STING has been elucidated as an endoplasmic reticulum protein. Also, it is likely that STING associates in close proximity with mitochondria associated ER membrane (MAM)-the interface between the mitochondrion and the ER. During intracellular infection, STING is able to relocalize from endoplasmic reticulum to perinuclear vesicles potentially involved in exocyst mediated transport. STING has also been shown to colocalize with autophagy proteins, microtubule-associated protein 1 light chain 3 (LC3) and autophagy-related protein 9A, after double-stranded DNA stimulation, suggesting its presence in the autophagosome.

== Function ==
STING mediates the type I interferon production in response to intracellular DNA and a variety of intracellular pathogens, including viruses, intracellular bacteria and intracellular parasites. Upon infection, STING from infected cells can sense the presence of nucleic acids from intracellular pathogens, and then induce interferon β and more than 10 forms of interferon α production. Type I interferon produced by infected cells can find and bind to Interferon-alpha/beta receptor of nearby cells to protect cells from local infection.

=== Antiviral immunity ===
STING elicits powerful type I interferon immunity against viral infection. After viral entry, viral nucleic acids are present in the cytosol of infected cells. Several DNA sensors, such as DAI, RNA polymerase III, IFI16, DDX41 and cGAS, can detect foreign nucleic acids. After recognizing viral DNA, DNA sensors initiate the downstream signaling pathways by activating STING-mediated interferon response.

Adenovirus, herpes simplex virus, HSV-1 and HSV-2, as well as the negative-stranded RNA virus, vesicular stomatitis virus (VSV), have been shown to be able to activate a STING-dependent innate immune response.

STING deficiency in mice led to lethal susceptibility to HSV-1 infection due to the lack of a successful type I interferon response.

Point mutation of serine-358 dampens STING-IFN activation in bats and is suggested to give bats their ability to serve as reservoir hosts.

=== Against intracellular bacteria ===
Intracellular bacteria, Listeria monocytogenes, have been shown to stimulate host immune response through STING. STING may play an important role in the production of MCP-1 and CCL7 chemokines. STING deficient monocytes are intrinsically defective in migration to the liver during Listeria monocytogenes infection. In this way, STING protects host from Listeria monocytogenes infection by regulating monocyte migration. The activation of STING is likely to be mediated by cyclic di-AMP secreted by intracellular bacteria.

=== Other ===
STING may be an important molecule for protective immunity against infectious organisms. For example, animals that cannot express STING are more susceptible to infection from VSV, HSV-1 and Listeria monocytogenes, suggesting its potential correlation to human infectious diseases.

=== Role in host immunity ===
Although type I IFN is absolutely critical for resistance to viruses, there is growing literature about the negative role of type I interferon in host immunity mediated by STING. AT-rich stem-loop DNA motif in the Plasmodium falciparum and Plasmodium berghei genome and extracellular DNA from Mycobacterium tuberculosis have been shown to activate type I interferon through STING. Perforation of the phagosome membrane mediated by ESX1 secretion system allows extracellular mycobacterial DNA to access host cytosolic DNA sensors, thus inducing the production of type I interferon in macrophages. High type I interferon signature leads to the M. tuberculosis pathogenesis and prolonged infection. STING-TBK1-IRF mediated type I interferon response is central to the pathogenesis of experimental cerebral malaria in laboratory animals infected with Plasmodium berghei. Laboratory mice deficient in type I interferon response are resistant to experimental cerebral malaria.

== STING signaling mechanisms ==
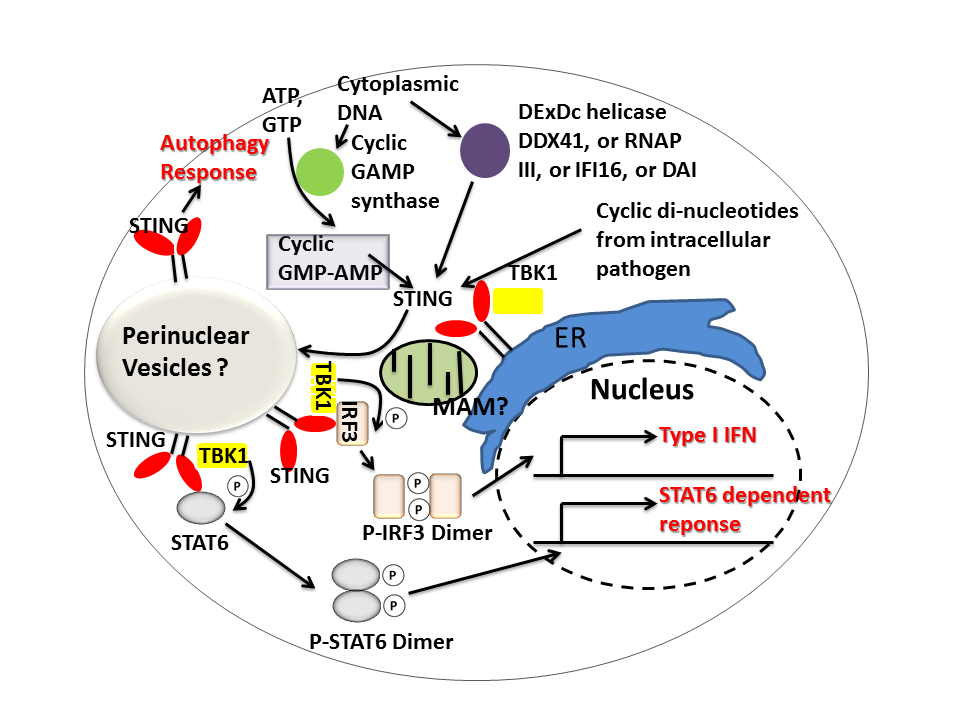
STING signaling

STING mediates type I interferon immune response by functioning as both a direct DNA sensor and a signaling adaptor protein. Upon activation, STING stimulates TBK1 activity to phosphorylate IRF3 or STAT6. Phosphorylated IRF3s and STAT6s dimerize, and then enter nucleus to stimulate expression of genes involved in host immune response, such as IFNB, CCL2, CCL20, etc.

Several reports suggested that STING is associated with the activation of selective autophagy. Mycobacterium tuberculosis has been shown to produce cytosolic DNA ligands which activate STING, resulting in ubiquitination of bacteria and the subsequent recruitment of autophagy related proteins, all of which are required for 'selective' autophagic targeting and innate defense against M. tuberculosis.

In summary, STING coordinates multiple immune responses to infection, including the induction of interferons and STAT6-dependent response and selective autophagy response.

=== As a cytosolic DNA sensor ===
Cyclic dinucleotides-second-messenger signaling molecules produced by diverse bacterial species were detected in the cytosol of mammalian cells during intracellular pathogen infection; this leads to activation of TBK1-IRF3 and the downstream production of type I interferon. STING has been shown to bind directly to cyclic di-GMP, and this recognition leads to the production of cytokines, such as type I interferon, that are essential for successful pathogen elimination.

=== As a signaling adaptor ===
DDX41, a member of the DEXDc family of helicases, in myeloid dendritic cells recognizes intracellular DNA and mediates innate immune response through direct association with STING. Other DNA sensors- DAI, RNA polymerase III, IFI16, have also been shown to activate STING through direct or indirect interactions.

Cyclic GMP-AMP synthase (cGAS), which belongs to the nucleotidyltransferase family, is able to recognize cytosolic DNA contents and induce STING-dependent interferon response by producing secondary messenger cyclic guanosine monophosphate–adenosine monophosphate (cyclic GMP-AMP, or cGAMP). After cyclic GMP-AMP bound STING is activated, it enhances TBK1's activity to phosphorylate IRF3 and STAT6 for downstream type I interferon response.

It has been proposed that intracellular calcium plays an important role in the response of the STING pathway.

=== Clinical significance ===
Gain-of-function mutations in STING1 (formerly TMEM173) cause STING-associated vasculopathy with onset in infancy (SAVI), a rare autoinflammatory type I interferonopathy. SAVI is characterized by early-onset systemic inflammation, cutaneous vasculopathy, and interstitial lung disease. Disease-causing mutations lead to constitutive STING activation and persistent activation of type I interferon signaling.

== Cancer immunotherapy ==
STING activation is being investigated as an approach to cancer immunotherapy, including the use of synthetic cyclic dinucleotide agonists administered intratumorally and in combination with immune checkpoint inhibitors like anti-PD-1 therapy. However, clinical trials of STING agonists have yet to produce durable efficacy, with challenges including drug delivery, heterogeneous tissue exposure, and systemic inflammatory toxicity. A complementary strategy is inhibition of extracellular cGAMP hydrolase ENPP1, which preserves tumor-derived extracellular cGAMP and prolongs STING activation in host cells rather than supplying an exogenous STING agonist.

== See also ==
- STING agonist – Component of the innate immune system
