= IKBKE =

Protein-coding gene in humans

Identifiers
- Aliases: IKBKE, IKK-E, IKK-i, IKKE, IKKI, inhibitor of kappa light polypeptide gene enhancer in B-cells, kinase epsilon, inhibitor of nuclear factor kappa B kinase subunit epsilon
- External IDs: OMIM: 605048; MGI: 1929612; GeneCards: IKBKE
Enzyme activity
EC #	BRENDA	ExPASy	KEGG	MetaCyc
2.7.11.10	↗	↗	↗	↗

Gene location (Human)
Chr.	Chromosome 1 (human)
Band	1q32.1	Start	206,470,476 bp
Band	1q32.1	End	206,496,889 bp

Gene location (Mouse)
Chr.	Chromosome 1 (mouse)
Band	1|1 E4	Start	131,182,080 bp
Band	1|1 E4	End	131,207,344 bp
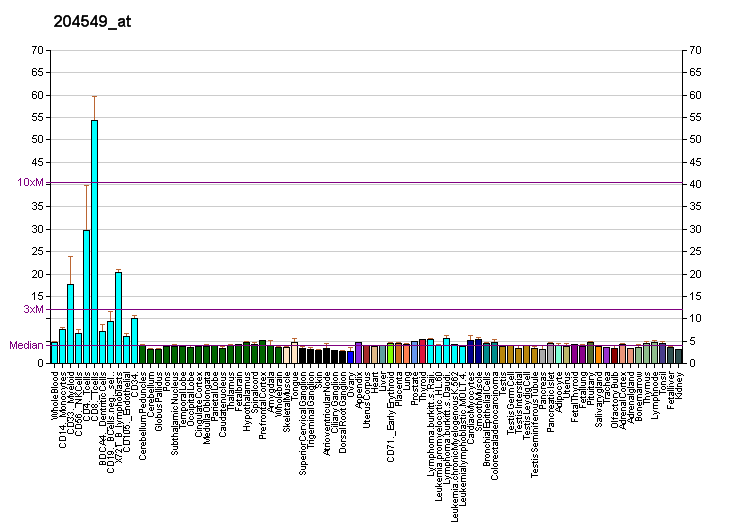

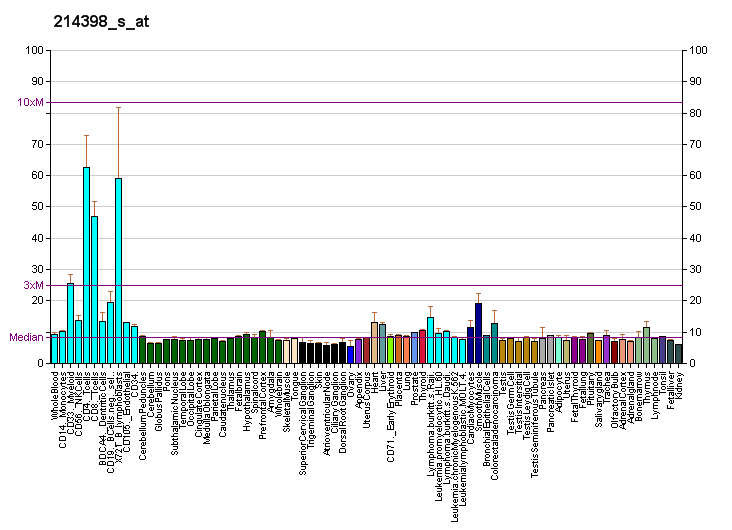
RNA expression pattern
Bgee	Human / Mouse (ortholog); Top expressed in: epithelium of colon; granulocyte; monocyte; blood; lymph node; bone marrow cell; appendix; mucosa of esophagus; tonsil; mucosa of transverse colon / Top expressed in: mesenteric lymph nodes; crypt of lieberkuhn of small intestine; thymus; stroma of bone marrow; granulocyte; jejunum; duodenum; ileum; blood; choroidal fissure; More reference expression data
BioGPS	More reference expression data
Gene ontology
Molecular function	transferase activity; IkappaB kinase activity; nucleotide binding; K48-linked polyubiquitin modification-dependent protein binding; kinase activity; protein serine/threonine kinase activity; NF-kappaB-inducing kinase activity; K63-linked polyubiquitin modification-dependent protein binding; protein binding; ATP binding; ubiquitin protein ligase binding; protein kinase activity; protein phosphatase binding
Cellular component	cytoplasm; cytosol; PML body; mitochondrial membranes; endosome membrane; nucleus; nucleoplasm
Biological process	cellular response to virus; phosphorylation; I-kappaB phosphorylation; response to interferon-beta; cellular response to DNA damage stimulus; TRIF-dependent toll-like receptor signaling pathway; protein phosphorylation; response to type I interferon; immune response; intrinsic apoptotic signaling pathway in response to DNA damage; positive regulation of I-kappaB kinase/NF-kappaB signaling; negative regulation of type I interferon production; protein homooligomerization; NIK/NF-kappaB signaling; positive regulation of lipid storage; peptidyl-serine phosphorylation; innate immune response; viral process; positive regulation of type I interferon-mediated signaling pathway
Sources:Amigo / QuickGO
Orthologs
Databases	NCBI: entry; OMA: entry
Species	Human	Mouse
Entrez	9641	56489
Ensembl	ENSG00000263528	ENSMUSG00000042349
UniProt	Q14164	Q9R0T8
RefSeq (mRNA)	NM_001193321; NM_001193322; NM_014002	NM_019777
RefSeq (protein)	NP_001180250; NP_001180251; NP_054721	NP_062751
Location (UCSC)	Chr 1: 206.47 – 206.5 Mb	Chr 1: 131.18 – 131.21 Mb
PubMed search
- Wikidata
View/Edit Human	View/Edit Mouse

Inhibitor of nuclear factor kappa-B kinase subunit epsilon also known as I-kappa-B kinase epsilon or IKK-epsilon is an enzyme that in humans is encoded by the IKBKE gene.

== Interactions ==
IKBKE has been shown to interact with TANK.

== Function ==
It is a serine/threonine kinase that plays an essential role in regulating inflammatory responses to viral infection, through the activation of the type I IFN, NF-kappa-B and STAT signaling. Also involved in TNFA and inflammatory cytokines, like Interleukin-1, signaling. Following activation of viral RNA sensors, such as RIG-I-like receptors, associates with DDX3X and phosphorylates interferon regulatory factors (IRFs), IRF3 and IRF7, as well as DDX3X. This activity allows subsequent homodimerization and nuclear translocation of the IRF3 leading to transcriptional activation of pro-inflammatory and antiviral genes including IFNB. In order to establish such an antiviral state, IKBKE forms several different complexes whose composition depends on the type of cell and cellular stimuli. Thus, several scaffolding molecules including IPS1/MAVS, TANK, AZI2/NAP1 or TBKBP1/SINTBAD (TANK-binding kinase 1-binding protein 1) can be recruited to the IKBKE-containing-complexes. Activated by polyubiquitination in response to TNFA and interleukin-1, regulates the NF-kappa-B signaling pathway through, at least, the phosphorylation of CYLD. Phosphorylates inhibitors of NF-kappa-B thus leading to the dissociation of the inhibitor/NF-kappa-B complex and ultimately the degradation of the inhibitor. In addition, is also required for the induction of a subset of ISGs which displays antiviral activity, may be through the phosphorylation of STAT1 at 'Ser-708'. Phosphorylation of STAT1 at 'Ser-708' seems also to promote the assembly and DNA binding of ISGF3 (STAT1:STAT2:IRF9) complexes compared to GAF (gamma-activation factor) (STAT1:STAT1) complexes, in this way regulating the balance between type I and type II IFN responses. Protects cells against DNA damage-induced cell death. Also plays an important role in energy balance regulation by sustaining a state of chronic, low-grade inflammation in obesity, which leads to a negative impact on insulin sensitivity. Phosphorylates AKT1.

== Clinical significance ==
Inhibition of IκB kinase (IKK) and IKK-related kinases, IKBKE (IKKε) and TANK-binding kinase 1 (TBK1), has been investigated as a therapeutic option for the treatment of inflammatory diseases and cancer.
