= PRDM1 =

Protein-coding gene in the species Homo sapiens

Identifiers
- Aliases: PRDM1, BLIMP1, PRDI-BF1, PR domain 1, PR/SET domain 1
- External IDs: OMIM: 603423; MGI: 99655; GeneCards: PRDM1
Available structures
PDB	Ortholog search: PDBe RCSB
PDB	List of PDB id codes 3DAL

Gene location (Human)
Chr.	Chromosome 6 (human)
Band	6q21	Start	105,993,463 bp
Band	6q21	End	106,109,939 bp

Gene location (Mouse)
Chr.	Chromosome 10 (mouse)
Band	10 B2|10 23.24 cM	Start	44,313,173 bp
Band	10 B2|10 23.24 cM	End	44,404,497 bp
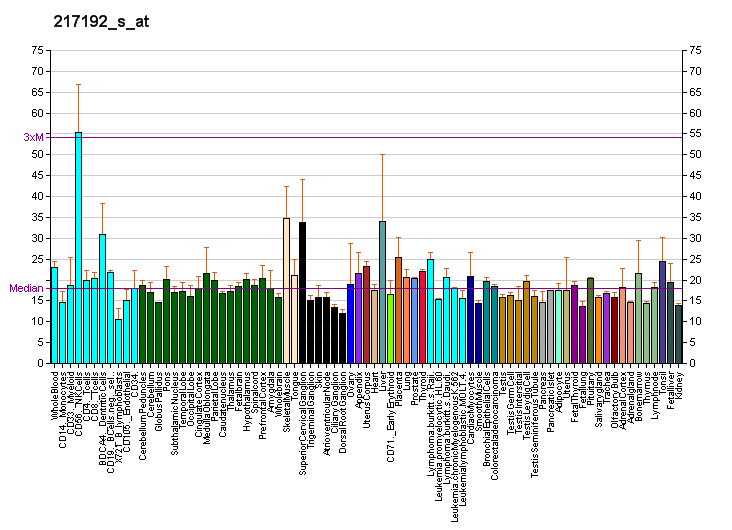
RNA expression pattern
Bgee	Human / Mouse (ortholog); Top expressed in: epithelium of colon; oral cavity; mucosa of pharynx; stromal cell of endometrium; rectum; skin of thigh; blood; vagina; bone marrow cell; superficial temporal artery / Top expressed in: gastrula; decidua; otic placode; zygote; otic vesicle; migratory enteric neural crest cell; lip; skin of back; esophagus; hair follicle; More reference expression data
BioGPS	More reference expression data
Gene ontology
Molecular function	methyltransferase activity; transferase activity; DNA binding; sequence-specific DNA binding; histone deacetylase binding; metal ion binding; RNA polymerase II cis-regulatory region sequence-specific DNA binding; DNA-binding transcription repressor activity, RNA polymerase II-specific; protein binding; nucleic acid binding; promoter-specific chromatin binding; DNA-binding transcription factor activity; DNA-binding transcription factor activity, RNA polymerase II-specific; RNA polymerase II transcription regulatory region sequence-specific DNA binding; chromatin DNA binding
Cellular component	cytoplasm; nucleus; nucleoplasm
Biological process	germ cell development; trophoblast giant cell differentiation; cardiac septum development; cell fate commitment; heart valve development; regulation of transcription, DNA-templated; ventricular septum development; intestinal epithelial cell development; positive regulation of B cell differentiation; embryonic placenta development; in utero embryonic development; negative regulation of transcription by RNA polymerase II; post-embryonic development; coronary vasculature development; negative regulation of gene expression; morphogenesis of a branching structure; transcription, DNA-templated; negative regulation of lipopolysaccharide-mediated signaling pathway; aorta development; methylation; positive regulation of gene expression; maternal placenta development; regulation of cell population proliferation; artery morphogenesis; eye photoreceptor cell development; sebum secreting cell proliferation; negative regulation of B cell proliferation; adaptive immune response; immune system process; regulation of natural killer cell differentiation; regulation of extrathymic T cell differentiation; innate immune response; regulation of NK T cell differentiation
Sources:Amigo / QuickGO
Orthologs
Databases	NCBI: entry; OMA: entry
Species	Human	Mouse
Entrez	639	12142
Ensembl	ENSG00000057657	ENSMUSG00000038151
UniProt	O75626	Q60636
RefSeq (mRNA)	NM_001198; NM_182907	NM_007548
RefSeq (protein)	NP_001189; NP_878911	NP_031574; NP_001392858; NP_001392859; NP_001392860; NP_001392861 NP_001392862; NP_001392863; NP_001392864; NP_001392865
Location (UCSC)	Chr 6: 105.99 – 106.11 Mb	Chr 10: 44.31 – 44.4 Mb
PubMed search
- Wikidata
View/Edit Human	View/Edit Mouse

PR domain zinc finger protein 1, or B lymphocyte-induced maturation protein-1 (BLIMP-1), is a protein in humans encoded by the gene PRDM1 located on chromosome 6q21. BLIMP-1 is considered a 'master regulator' of hematopoietic stem cells, and plays a critical role in the development of plasma B cells, T cells, dendritic cells (DCs), macrophages, and osteoclasts. Pattern Recognition Receptors (PRRs) can activate BLIMP-1, both as a direct target and through downstream activation. BLIMP-1 is a transcription factor that triggers expression of many downstream signaling cascades. As a fine-tuned and contextual rheostat of the immune system, BLIMP-1 up- or down-regulates immune responses depending on the precise scenarios. BLIMP-1 is highly expressed in exhausted T-cells – clones of dysfunctional T-cells with diminished functions due to chronic immune response against cancer, viral infections, or organ transplant.

== Function ==
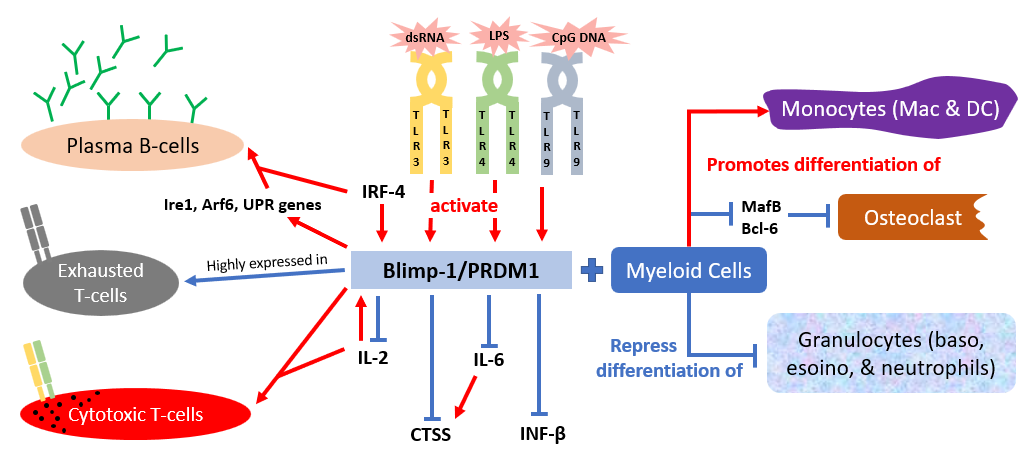
PRDM1/BLIMP-1 is a master transcription factor regulating downstream cytokines. It is activated by TLRs and IRF-4, and is crucial in T cell, B cell, and myeloid lineage cell differentiations.

As a potent repressor of beta-interferon (IFN-β), BLIMP-1 competes for interferon regulatory factors (IRF) binding sites in the IFN-β promoter due to its sequence similarity with IRF1 and IRF2. However, BLIMP-1 cools down and activates immune responses in a highly contextual manner. BLIMP-1 represses NFκB/TNF-R pathway repressor NLRP12, thus indirectly activating the immune response. BLIMP-1 expression is also upregulated by danger signals from double-stranded RNA (specific to virus), lipopolysaccharides (specific to gram-negative bacteria), unmethylated CpG DNA (abundant in bacterial genomes), and cancer inflammation via Toll-like receptor (TLR) 3, TLR-4, TLR-9, and STAT signaling, respectively.

The increased expression of the BLIMP-1 protein in B lymphocytes, T lymphocytes, NK cells and other immune system cells leads to an immune response through proliferation and differentiation of antibody secreting plasma cells. In a monocytic cell line, over-expression of BLIMP-1 can lead to differentiation into mature macrophages. BLIMP-1 also plays a role in osteoclastogenesis as well as in the modulation of dendritic cells. Other cells of the immune system such as human peripheral blood monocytes and granulocytes also express BLIMP-1.

As a transcriptional repressor, BLIMP-1 has a critical role in the foundation of the mouse germ cell lineage, as its disruption causes a block early in the process of primordial germ cell formation. BLIMP-1-deficient mutant embryos form a tight cluster of about 20 primordial germ cell-like cells, which fail to show the characteristic migration, proliferation and consistent repression of homeobox genes that normally accompany specification of primordial germ cells. BLIMP-1 is widely expressed in stem cells of developing embryos. The genetic lineage-tracing experiments indicate that the BLIMP-1-positive cells originating from the proximal posterior epiblast cells are indeed the lineage-restricted primordial germ cell precursors.

=== B cells ===
BLIMP-1 is an important regulator of plasma cell differentiation. During B cell development, a B cell can either differentiate into a short-lived plasma cell or into a germinal center B cell after receiving proper activation and co-stimulation. BLIMP-1 acts as a master gene regulating the transcriptional network that regulates B cell terminal differentiation. Except for naïve and memory B cells, all antibody secreting cells express BLIMP-1 regardless of their location and differentiation history. BLIMP-1 directly initiates unfolded protein response (UPR) by activating Ire1, Xbp1, and Arf6, allowing the plasma B cells to produce vast amounts of antibody. BLIMP-1 expression is carefully controlled: the expression of BLIMP-1 is low or undetectable in primary B cells, and only upregulated in plasmablasts and plasma cells. BLIMP-1 is a direct transcriptional target of IRF-4, which is also necessary for B-cell differentiation. The premature expression of BLIMP-1 in primary B cells results in cell death, so only cells that are ready to initiate transcription driven by BLIMP-1 are able to survive and differentiate. However, without BLIMP-1, proliferating B cells are unable to differentiate to plasma cells, resulting in severe reduction in production of all isotypes of immunoglobulin.

=== T cells ===
BLIMP-1 promotes naive T-cells to differentiate into T-helper (Th) 2 lineage, while repressing the differentiation into Th1, Th17, and follicular Th. BLIMP-1 is also required for differentiation of cytotoxic T-cell. Specifically, the expression of granzyme B (a source of cytotoxicity) in Tc depends on the presence of BLIMP-1 and interleukin-2 (IL-2) cytokine.

BLIMP-1 is a gatekeeper of T-cell activation and plays a key role in maintaining normal T cell homeostasis. BLIMP-1 deficiency leads to high numbers of activated T helper cells and severe autoimmune diseases in laboratory mice. BLIMP-1 is important in dampening autoimmunity, as well as antiviral and antitumor responses. BLIMP-1 regulates T cell activation through a negative feedback loop: T cell activation leads to IL-2 production, IL-2 leads to PRDM1 transcription, and BLIMP-1 feeds back to repress IL-2 gene transcription.

=== Macrophages ===
BLIMP-1 has been shown in vitro as a cell lineage determinant in monocytes, inducing their differentiation into DCs and macrophages. It is speculated to have the similar effects in vivo. In addition, BLIMP-1 also suppressed myeloid cells from differentiating into granulocytes, which includes eosinophil, basophil, and neutrophils. The role of BLIMP-1 in DCs and macrophages development is a matter of interest because analysis have suggested that DCs, rather than B-cells, is the way in which individual with single nucleotide polymorphisms (SNP) near BLIMP-1 (specifically, rs548234 in Han Chinese, and rs6568431 in European) are predisposed to Systemic Lupus Erythematosus (SLE).

=== Osteoclasts ===
Osteoclasts are multinucleated cells that break down and resorb bone tissues. Together with osteoblasts, which form new bones, osteoclast helps maintain and repair bone in vertebrates. BLIMP-1 directly and indirectly represses anti-osteoclastogenesis genes such as Bcl6, IRF8, and MafB, helping monocytes differentiate into osteoclasts. In mice, insufficient expression of BLIMP-1 in osteoclast progenitors would lead to abnormal development of the skeleton.

== Clinical significance ==
=== T cell exhaustion ===
Multiple studies have reported high expression of BLIMP-1 in exhausted T cells. T cell exhaustion is usually a result of chronic immune activations, commonly caused by viral infection (e.g. HIV), cancer, or organ transplant. High expression of BLIMP-1 in Tc and Th cells is associated with the transcription of receptors inhibiting immune responses, though it is unclear whether the relation between BLIMP-1 expression and T-cell exhaustion is causal or just associative.

BLIMP-1 helps the production of short-lived effector T cells and clonally exhausted T cells. It also helps with the migration of T cells out of the spleen and lymph nodes into peripheral tissues. However, BLIMP-1 does not promote the production of long-lived effector memory cells. BLIMP-1 allows the production of some longer lived effector memory cells but its absence allows for the generation of long term central memory cells, which are thought to have a higher potential of proliferation on secondary challenge.

=== Diseases ===
SNPs near the PRDM1 gene have been identified in genome-wide association studies (GWAS) to be linked to lupus (SLE) and rheumatoid arthritis (RA). BLIMP-1 represses the expression of the proinflammatory cytokine Interleukin-6 (IL-6), and cathepsin S (CTSS), which promotes antigen processing and presentation. BLIMP-1 deficiency and IL-6 overexpression were linked to inflammatory bowel disease (IBD) and SLE.

Another GWAS has identified two genetic variations near the PRDM1 gene that predict an increased likelihood of developing a second cancer after radiation treatment for Hodgkin lymphoma.
