= TANK-binding kinase 1 =

Protein found in humans

TBK1
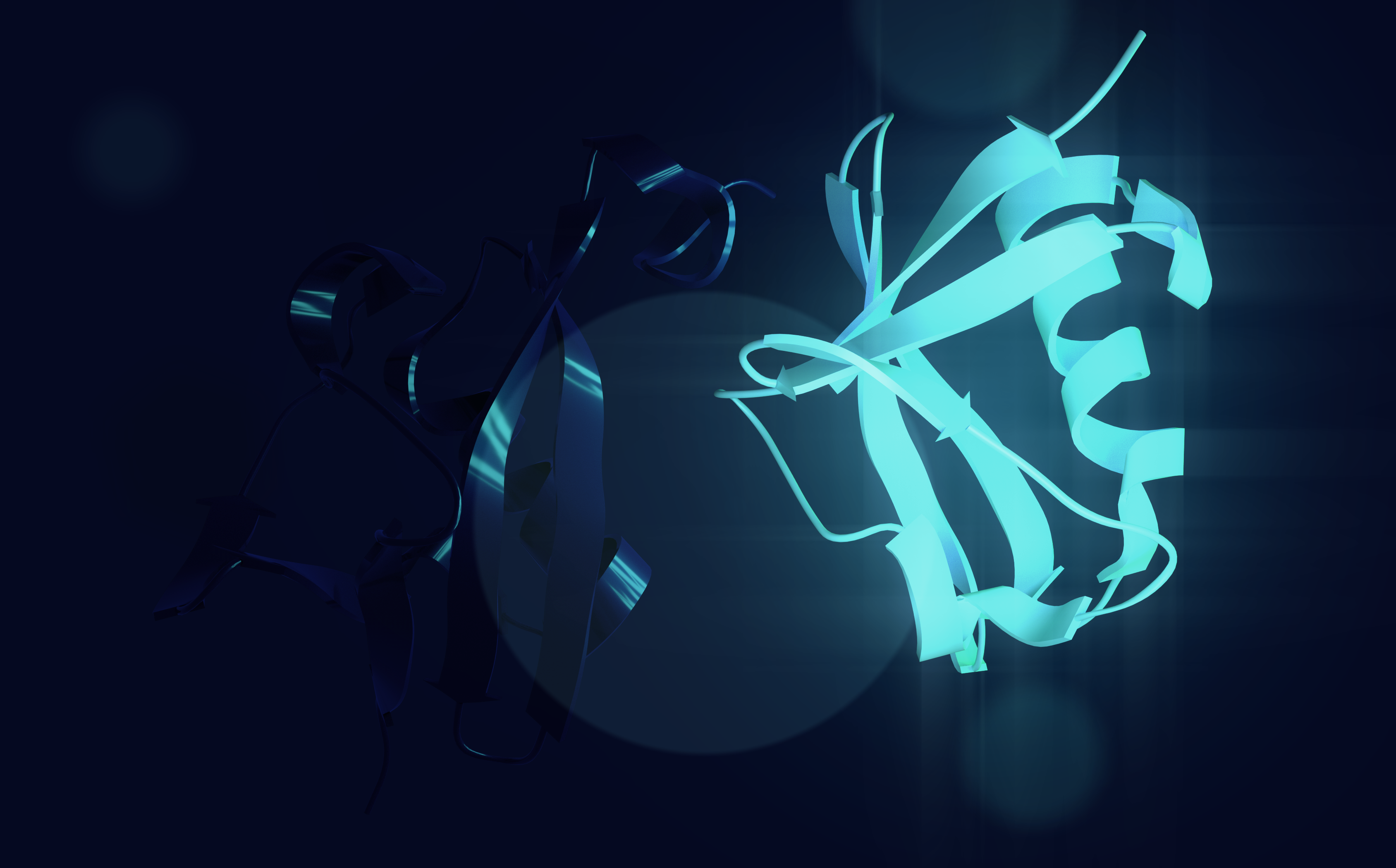

Identifiers
- Aliases: TBK1, Tbk1, 1200008B05Rik, AI462036, AW048562, NAK, T2K, FTDALS4, TANK binding kinase 1, IIAE8
- External IDs: OMIM: 604834; MGI: 1929658; GeneCards: TBK1
Available structures
PDB	Ortholog search: PDBe RCSB
PDB	List of PDB id codes 4EFO, 4EUT, 4EUU, 4IM0, 4IM2, 4IM3, 4IW0, 4IWO, 4IWP, 4IWQ
Enzyme activity
EC #	BRENDA	ExPASy	KEGG	MetaCyc
2.7.11.1	↗	↗	↗	↗

Gene location (Human)
Chr.	Chromosome 12 (human)
Band	12q14.2	Start	64,452,090 bp
Band	12q14.2	End	64,502,114 bp

Gene location (Mouse)
Chr.	Chromosome 10 (mouse)
Band	10|10 D2	Start	121,382,360 bp
Band	10|10 D2	End	121,422,692 bp
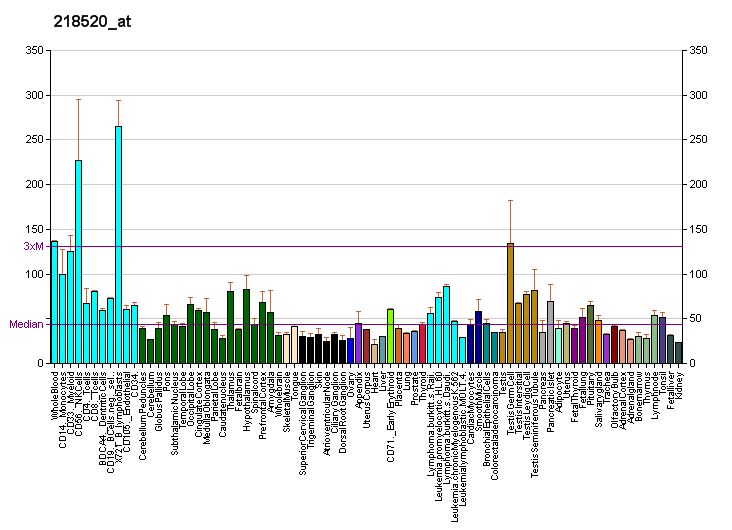
RNA expression pattern
Bgee	Human / Mouse (ortholog); Top expressed in: epithelium of colon; Achilles tendon; lateral nuclear group of thalamus; secondary oocyte; sperm; monocyte; sural nerve; ventricular zone; tonsil; bone marrow cell / Top expressed in: Paneth cell; facial motor nucleus; condyle; Epithelium of choroid plexus; fossa; substantia nigra; conjunctival fornix; iris; stroma of bone marrow; vestibular membrane of cochlear duct; More reference expression data
BioGPS	More reference expression data
Gene ontology
Molecular function	transferase activity; nucleotide binding; kinase activity; protein serine/threonine kinase activity; phosphoprotein binding; protein binding; nucleic acid binding; ATP binding; protein kinase activity; identical protein binding; protein phosphatase binding
Cellular component	cytoplasm; cytosol; endosome membrane; nucleoplasm; aggresome
Biological process	phosphorylation; positive regulation of interferon-alpha production; immune system process; response to virus; positive regulation of xenophagy; negative regulation of gene expression; positive regulation of peptidyl-serine phosphorylation; TRIF-dependent toll-like receptor signaling pathway; type I interferon production; defense response to virus; peptidyl-serine phosphorylation; regulation of neuron death; activation of innate immune response; positive regulation of I-kappaB kinase/NF-kappaB signaling; negative regulation of type I interferon production; innate immune response; viral process; inflammatory response; I-kappaB kinase/NF-kappaB signaling; positive regulation of type I interferon production; positive regulation of transcription by RNA polymerase II; dendritic cell proliferation; defense response to Gram-positive bacterium; positive regulation of interferon-beta production; regulation of type I interferon production; positive regulation of macroautophagy; peptidyl-threonine phosphorylation; protein phosphorylation; cellular response to cytokine stimulus; regulation of gene expression; regulation of cellular metabolic process; positive regulation of type I interferon-mediated signaling pathway
Sources:Amigo / QuickGO
Orthologs
Databases	NCBI: entry; OMA: entry
Species	Human	Mouse
Entrez	29110	56480
Ensembl	ENSG00000183735	ENSMUSG00000020115
UniProt	Q9UHD2	Q9WUN2
RefSeq (mRNA)	NM_013254	NM_019786
RefSeq (protein)	NP_037386	NP_062760
Location (UCSC)	Chr 12: 64.45 – 64.5 Mb	Chr 10: 121.38 – 121.42 Mb
PubMed search
- Wikidata
View/Edit Human	View/Edit Mouse

TBK1 (TANK-binding kinase 1) is an enzyme with kinase activity. Specifically, it is a serine / threonine protein kinase. It is encoded by the TBK1 gene in humans. This kinase is mainly known for its role in innate immunity antiviral response. However, TBK1 also regulates cell proliferation, apoptosis, autophagy, and anti-tumor immunity. Insufficient regulation of TBK1 activity leads to autoimmune, neurodegenerative diseases or tumorigenesis.

== Structure ==
TBK1 is a non-canonical IKK kinase that phosphorylates the nuclear factor kB (NFkB). It shares sequence homology with canonical IKK.

The N-terminus of the protein contains the kinase domain (region 9-309) and the ubiquitin-like domain (region 310-385). The C-terminus is formed by two coiled-coil structures (region 407-713) that provide a surface for homodimerization.

== Regulation ==
The autophosphorylation of serine 172, which requires homodimerization and ubiquitinylation of lysines 30 and 401, is necessary for kinase activity.

== Function ==
TBK1 is involved in many signaling pathways and forms a node between them. For this reason, regulation of its involvement in individual signaling pathways is necessary. This is provided by adaptor proteins that interact with the dimerization domain of TBK1 to determine its location and access to substrates. Binding to TANK leads to localization to the perinuclear region and phosphorylation of substrates which is required for subsequent production of type I interferons (IFN-I). In contrast, binding to NAP1 and SINTBAD leads to localization in the cytoplasm and involvement in autophagy. Another adaptor protein that determines the location of TBK1 is TAPE. TAPE targets TBK1 to endolysosomes.

A key interest in TBK1 is due to its role in innate immunity, especially in antiviral responses. TBK1 is redundant with IKK$\epsilon$, but TBK1 seems to play a more important role. After triggering antiviral signaling through PRRs (pattern recognition receptors), TBK1 is activated. Subsequently, it phosphorylates the transcription factor IRF3, which is translocated to the nucleus, and promotes production of IFN-I.

As a non-canonical IκB kinases (IKK), TBK1 is also involved in the non-canonical NF-κB pathway. It phosphorylates p100/NF-κB2, which is subsequently processed in the proteasome and released as a p52 subunit. This subunit dimerizes with RelB and mediates gene expression.

In the canonical NF-κB pathway, the NF-kappa-B (NF-κB) complex of proteins is inhibited by I-kappa-B (IκB) proteins, which inactivate NF-κB by trapping it in the cytoplasm. Phosphorylation of serine residues on the IκB proteins by IκB kinases (IKK) marks them for destruction via the ubiquitination pathway, thereby allowing activation and nuclear translocation of the NF-κB complex. The protein encoded by this gene is similar to IκB kinases and can mediate NF-κB activation in response to certain growth factors.

TBK1 promotes autophagy involved in pathogen and mitochondrial clearance. TBK1 phosphorylates autophagy receptors and components of the autophagy apparatus. Furthermore, TBK1 is also involved in the regulation of cell proliferation, apoptosis and glucose metabolism.

== Interactions ==
TANK-binding kinase 1 has been shown to interact with:

- NCK1,
- TANK,
- TRAF2 and
- TBKBP1 aka SINTBAD

Transcription factors activated upon TBK1 activation include IRF3, IRF7 and ZEB1.

== Clinical significance ==
Deregulation of TBK1 activity and mutations in this protein are associated with many diseases. Due to the role of TBK1 in cell survival, deregulation of its activity is associated with tumorogenesis. There are also many autoimmune (e.g., rheumatoid arthritis, sympathetic lupus), neurodegenerative (e.g., amyotrophic lateral sclerosis), and infantile (e.g., herpesviral encephalitis) diseases.

The loss of TBK1 causes embryonic lethality in mice.

Inhibition of IκB kinase (IKK) and IKK-related kinases, IKBKE (IKKε) and TANK-binding kinase 1 (TBK1), has been investigated as a therapeutic option for the treatment of inflammatory diseases and cancer, and a way to overcome resistance to cancer immunotherapy.

== See also ==
- CGAS–STING cytosolic DNA sensing pathway
