= IRF5 =

Protein-coding gene in the species Homo sapiens

Identifiers
- Aliases: IRF5, SLEB10, interferon regulatory factor 5
- External IDs: OMIM: 607218; MGI: 1350924; GeneCards: IRF5
Available structures
PDB	Ortholog search: PDBe RCSB
PDB	List of PDB id codes 3DSH

Gene location (Human)
Chr.	Chromosome 7 (human)
Band	7q32.1	Start	128,937,457 bp
Band	7q32.1	End	128,950,038 bp

Gene location (Mouse)
Chr.	Chromosome 6 (mouse)
Band	6 A3.3|6 12.36 cM	Start	29,526,624 bp
Band	6 A3.3|6 12.36 cM	End	29,541,870 bp
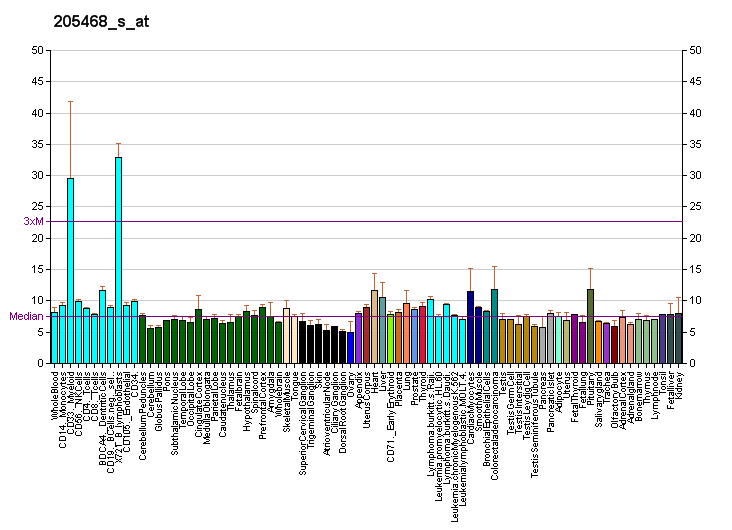

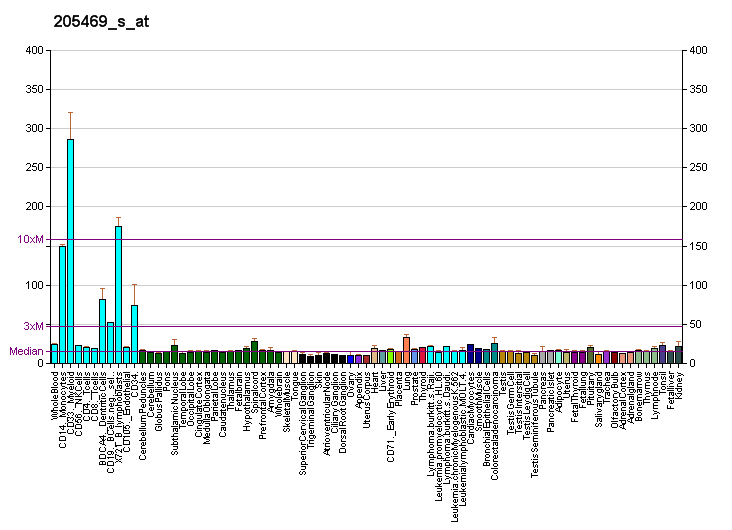
RNA expression pattern
Bgee	Human / Mouse (ortholog); Top expressed in: monocyte; granulocyte; spleen; blood; bone marrow cell; lymph node; upper lobe of left lung; testicle; right uterine tube; right coronary artery / Top expressed in: mesenteric lymph nodes; stroma of bone marrow; granulocyte; spleen; lip; right kidney; female urethra; proximal tubule; esophagus; blastocyst; More reference expression data
BioGPS	More reference expression data
Gene ontology
Molecular function	DNA binding; DNA-binding transcription factor activity; protein binding; DNA-binding transcription activator activity, RNA polymerase II-specific; sequence-specific DNA binding; identical protein binding; DNA-binding transcription factor activity, RNA polymerase II-specific
Cellular component	cytoplasm; cytosol; nucleus
Biological process	regulation of transcription, DNA-templated; positive regulation of interleukin-12 production; interferon-gamma-mediated signaling pathway; immune system process; regulation of transcription by RNA polymerase II; positive regulation of interferon-alpha production; response to muramyl dipeptide; transcription, DNA-templated; defense response to virus; type I interferon signaling pathway; response to peptidoglycan; positive regulation of apoptotic process; innate immune response; positive regulation of transcription by RNA polymerase II; positive regulation of interferon-beta production; cytokine-mediated signaling pathway; transcription by RNA polymerase II
Sources:Amigo / QuickGO
Orthologs
Databases	NCBI: entry; OMA: entry
Species	Human	Mouse
Entrez	3663	27056
Ensembl	ENSG00000128604	ENSMUSG00000029771
UniProt	Q13568	P56477
RefSeq (mRNA)	NM_001098627; NM_001098629; NM_001098630; NM_001242452; NM_032643 NM_001347928; NM_001364314	NM_001252382; NM_012057; NM_001311083
RefSeq (protein)	NP_001092097; NP_001092099; NP_001092100; NP_001229381; NP_116032 NP_001334857; NP_001351243; NP_001092099.1	NP_001239311; NP_001298012; NP_036187
Location (UCSC)	Chr 7: 128.94 – 128.95 Mb	Chr 6: 29.53 – 29.54 Mb
PubMed search
- Wikidata
View/Edit Human	View/Edit Mouse

Interferon regulatory factor 5 is a protein that in humans is encoded by the IRF5 gene. The IRF family is a group of transcription factors that are involved in signaling for virus responses in mammals along with regulation of certain cellular functions.

== Function ==
IRF5 is a member of the interferon regulatory factor (IRF) family, a group of transcription factors with diverse roles, including virus-mediated activation of interferon, and modulation of cell growth, differentiation, apoptosis, and immune system activity. Members of the IRF family are characterized by a conserved N-terminal DNA-binding domain containing tryptophan (W) repeats. Alternative splice variants encoding different isoforms exist. The regulatory and repression regions of the IRF family are mainly located in the C-terminal of the IRF.

A 2020 study showed that an adaptor protein named TASL play an important regulatory role in IRF5 activation by being phosphorylated at the pLxIS motif, drawing a similar analogy to the IRF3 activation pathway through the adaptor proteins MAVS, STING and TRIF.

== Clinical significance ==
IRF5 acts as a molecular switch that controls whether macrophages will promote or inhibit inflammation, so called Macrophage Polarization. M1 macrophages are pro-inflammatory and express high levels of IRF5. Blocking the production of IRF5 in macrophages may help treat a wide range of autoimmune diseases, and that boosting IRF5 levels might help treat people whose immune systems are weak, compromised, or damaged. IRF5 seems to work "either by interacting with DNA directly, or by interacting with other proteins that themselves control which genes are switched on."

== Signaling ==
The IRF family regulates the gene expression for the interferon (IFN) response to viral infections. IRF5 is a direct transducer to interferon signaling and is activated via phosphorylation. The IRF family can also initiate the JAK/STAT signaling pathway by binding to transmembrane receptors that activate JAK. IRFs, IFNs, and the JAK/STAT signaling pathway work together to fight viral infections in mammals through specific signals.

== See also ==
- Interferon regulatory factors
