= TANK (gene) =

Protein-coding gene in the species Homo sapiens

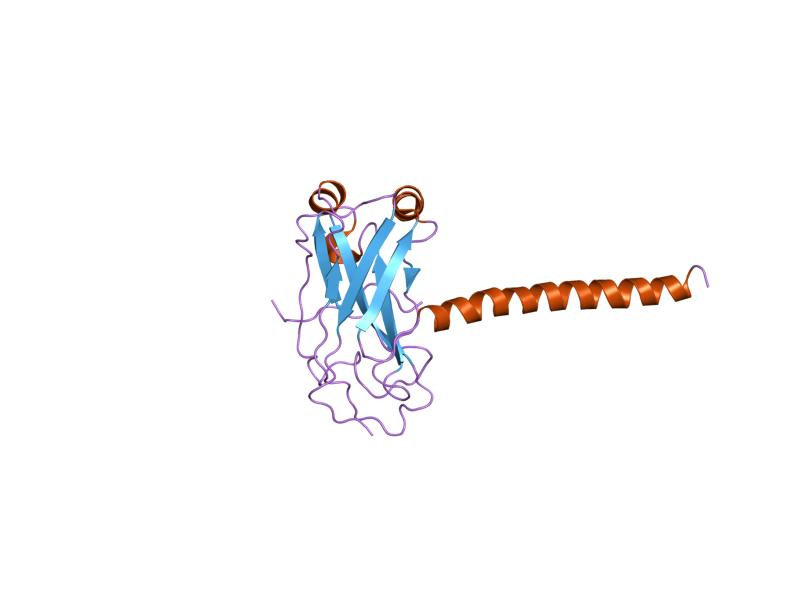

Identifiers
- Aliases: TANK, I-TRAF, ITRAF, TRAF2, TRAF family member associated NFKB activator
- External IDs: OMIM: 603893; MGI: 107676; GeneCards: TANK
Available structures
PDB	Ortholog search: PDBe RCSB
PDB	List of PDB id codes 1KZZ, 1L0A

Gene location (Human)
Chr.	Chromosome 2 (human)
Band	2q24.2	Start	161,136,908 bp
Band	2q24.2	End	161,236,230 bp

Gene location (Mouse)
Chr.	Chromosome 2 (mouse)
Band	2|2 C1.3	Start	61,578,585 bp
Band	2|2 C1.3	End	61,654,171 bp
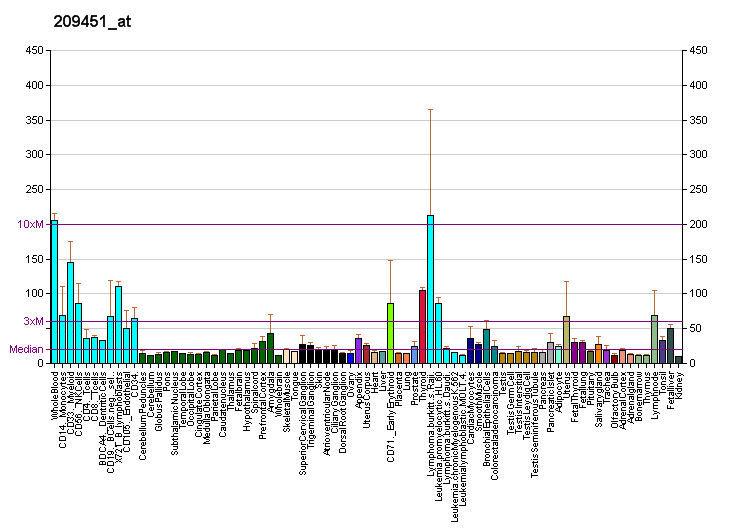

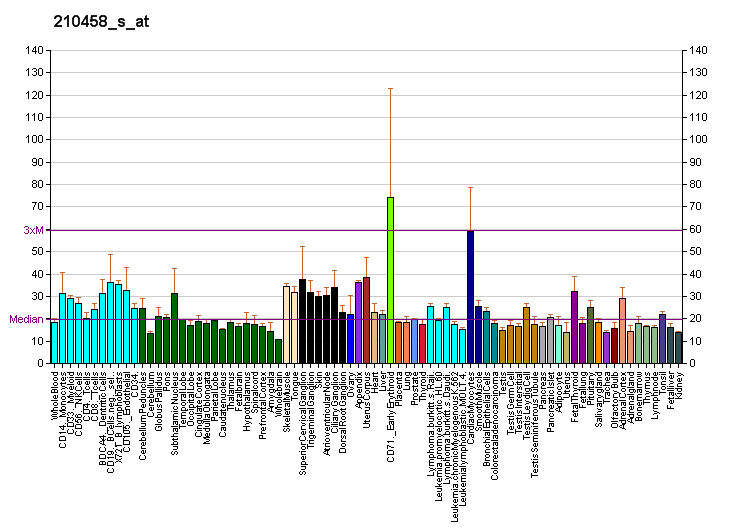

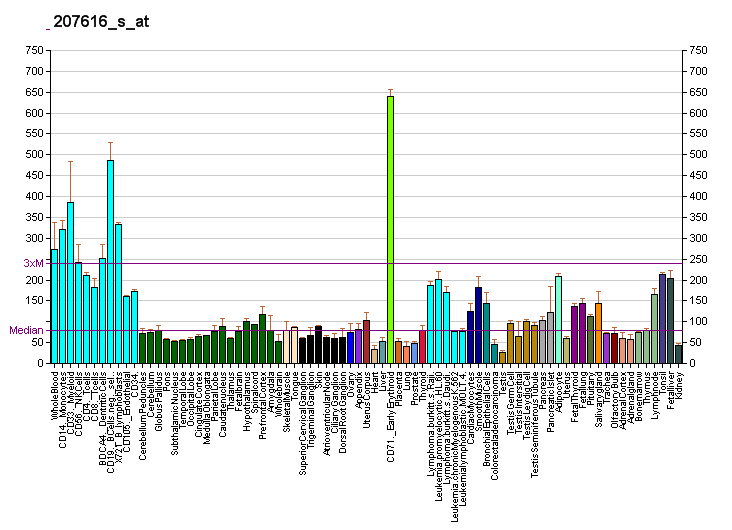
RNA expression pattern
Bgee	Human / Mouse (ortholog); Top expressed in: monocyte; Achilles tendon; germinal epithelium; epithelium of nasopharynx; bone marrow cell; lactiferous duct; gallbladder; trabecular bone; lymph node; lower lobe of lung / Top expressed in: granulocyte; submandibular gland; genital tubercle; Paneth cell; skin of external ear; spleen; subcutaneous adipose tissue; zygote; white adipose tissue; tail of embryo; More reference expression data
BioGPS	More reference expression data
Gene ontology
Molecular function	protein binding; ubiquitin protein ligase binding; metal ion binding; deubiquitinase activator activity; thiol-dependent deubiquitinase
Cellular component	cytoplasm; cytosol; protein-containing complex
Biological process	TRIF-dependent toll-like receptor signaling pathway; signal transduction; positive regulation of ubiquitin-specific protease activity; positive regulation of protein deubiquitination; cellular response to tumor necrosis factor; negative regulation of I-kappaB kinase/NF-kappaB signaling; cellular response to interleukin-1; proteolysis; cellular response to ionizing radiation; cellular response to DNA damage stimulus; I-kappaB kinase/NF-kappaB signaling; viral process
Sources:Amigo / QuickGO
Orthologs
Databases	NCBI: entry; OMA: entry
Species	Human	Mouse
Entrez	10010	21353
Ensembl	ENSG00000136560	ENSMUSG00000064289
UniProt	Q92844; Q6NW12	P70347
RefSeq (mRNA)	NM_001199135; NM_004180; NM_133484	NM_001164071; NM_001164072; NM_011529; NM_001355267; NM_001355268 NM_001374667; NM_001378922
RefSeq (protein)	NP_001186064; NP_004171; NP_597841; NP_001186064.1	NP_001157543; NP_001157544; NP_035659; NP_001342196; NP_001342197 NP_001361596; NP_001365851
Location (UCSC)	Chr 2: 161.14 – 161.24 Mb	Chr 2: 61.58 – 61.65 Mb
PubMed search
- Wikidata
View/Edit Human	View/Edit Mouse

TRAF family member-associated NF-kappa-B activator is a protein that in humans is encoded by the TANK gene.

== Function ==
The TRAF (tumor necrosis factor receptor-associated factor) family of proteins associate with and transduce signals from members of the tumor necrosis factor receptor superfamily. The protein encoded by this gene is found in the cytoplasm and can bind to TRAF1, TRAF2, or TRAF3, thereby inhibiting TRAF function by sequestering the TRAFs in a latent state in the cytoplasm. For example, the protein encoded by this gene can block TRAF2 binding to LMP1, the Epstein-Barr virus transforming protein, and inhibit LMP1-mediated NF-kappa-B activation. Two transcript variants encoding different isoforms have been found for this gene.

== Interactions ==
TANK (gene) has been shown to interact with TANK-binding kinase 1, IKBKE, TRAF2, IKBKG and TRAF3.
