= Interferon regulatory factors =

Protein family

Interferon regulatory factor transcription factor
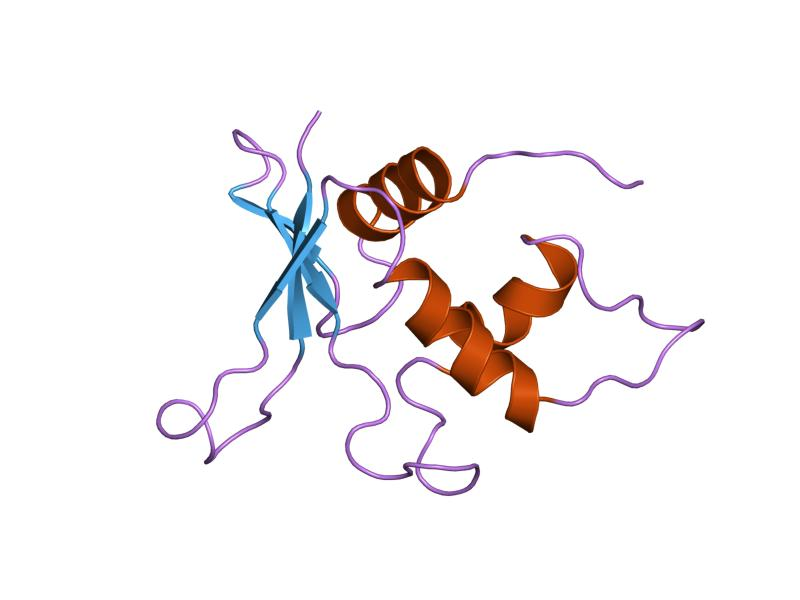
- interferon regulatory factor-2 dna binding domain, nmr, minimized average structure

Identifiers
- Symbol: IRF
- Pfam: PF00605
- InterPro: IPR001346
- SCOP2: 1if1 / SCOPe / SUPFAM
Available protein structures:
- PDB: IPR001346 PF00605 (ECOD; PDBsum)
- AlphaFold: IPR001346; PF00605

Interferon regulatory factors (IRF) are proteins which regulate transcription of interferons (see regulation of gene expression). Interferon regulatory factors contain a conserved N-terminal region of about 120 amino acids, which folds into a structure that binds specifically to the IRF-element (IRF-E) motifs, which is located upstream of the interferon genes. Some viruses have evolved defense mechanisms that regulate and interfere with IRF functions to escape the host immune system. For instance, the remaining parts of the interferon regulatory factor sequence vary depending on the precise function of the protein. The Kaposi sarcoma herpesvirus, KSHV, is a cancer virus that encodes four different IRF-like genes; including vIRF1, which is a transforming oncoprotein that inhibits type 1 interferon activity. In addition, the expression of IRF genes is under epigenetic regulation by promoter DNA methylation.

== Role in IFN signaling ==
IRFs primarily regulate type I IFNs in the host after pathogen invasion and are considered the crucial mediators of an antiviral response. Following a viral infection, pathogens are detected by Pattern Recognition Receptors (PRRs), including various types of Toll-like Receptors (TLR) and cytosolic PRRs, in the host cell. The downstream signaling pathways from PRR activation phosphorylate ubiquitously expressed IRFs (IRF1, IRF3, and IRF7) through IRF kinases, such as TANK-binding kinase 1 (TBK1). Phosphorylated IRFs are translocated to the nucleus where they bind to IRF-E motifs and activate the transcription of Type I IFNs. In addition to IFNs, IRF1 and IRF5 has been found to induce transcription of pro-inflammatory cytokines.

Some IFNs like IRF2 and IRF4 regulate the activation of IFNs and pro-inflammatory cytokines through inhibition. IRF2 contains a repressor region that downregulates expression of type I IFNs. IRF4 competes with IRF5, and inhibits its sustained activity.

== Role in immune cell development ==
In addition to the signal transduction functions of IRFs in innate immune responses, multiple IRFs (IRF1, IRF2, IRF4, and IRF8) play essential roles in the development of immune cells, including dendritic, myeloid, natural killer (NK), B, and T cells.

Dendritic cells (DC) are a group of heterogeneous cells that can be divided into different subsets with distinct functions and developmental programs. IRF4 and IRF8 specify and direct the differentiation of different subsets of DCs by stimulating subset-specific gene expression. For example, IRF4 is required for the generation of CD4 + DCs, whereas IRF8 is essential for CD8α + DCs. In addition to IRF4 and IRF8, IRF1 and IRF2 are also involved in DC subset development.

IRF8 has also been implicated in the promotion of macrophage development from common myeloid progenitors (CMPs) and the inhibition of granulocytic differentiation during the divergence of granulocytes and monocytes.

IRF8 and IRF4 are also involved in the regulation of B and T-cell development at multiple stages. IRF8 and IRF4 function redundantly to drive common lymphoid progenitors (CLPs) to B-cell lineage. IRF8 and IRF4 are also required in the regulation of germinal center (GC) B cell differentiation.

== Role in diseases ==
IRFs are critical regulators of immune responses and immune cell development, and abnormalities in IRF expression and function have been linked to numerous diseases. Due to their critical role in IFN type I activation, IRFs are implicated in autoimmune diseases that are linked to activation of IFN type I system, such as systemic lupus erythematosus (SLE). Accumulating evidence also indicates that IRFs play a major role in the regulation of cellular responses linked to oncogenesis. In addition to autoimmune diseases and cancers, IRFs are also found to be involved in the pathogenesis of metabolic, cardiovascular, and neurological diseases, such as hepatic steatosis, diabetes, cardiac hypertrophy, atherosclerosis, and stroke.

== Genes ==
- IRF1
- IRF2
- IRF3
- IRF4
- IRF5
- IRF6
- IRF7
- IRF8
- IRF9

== See also ==
- Interferon
