= KLF13 =

Protein found in humans

Identifiers
- Aliases: KLF13, BTEB3, FKLF2, NSLP1, RFLAT-1, RFLAT1, Kruppel-like factor 13, Kruppel like factor 13
- External IDs: OMIM: 605328; MGI: 1354948; GeneCards: KLF13

Gene location (Human)
Chr.	Chromosome 15 (human)
Band	15q13.3	Start	31,326,835 bp
Band	15q13.3	End	31,435,665 bp

Gene location (Mouse)
Chr.	Chromosome 7 (mouse)
Band	7|7 C	Start	63,536,099 bp
Band	7|7 C	End	63,588,663 bp
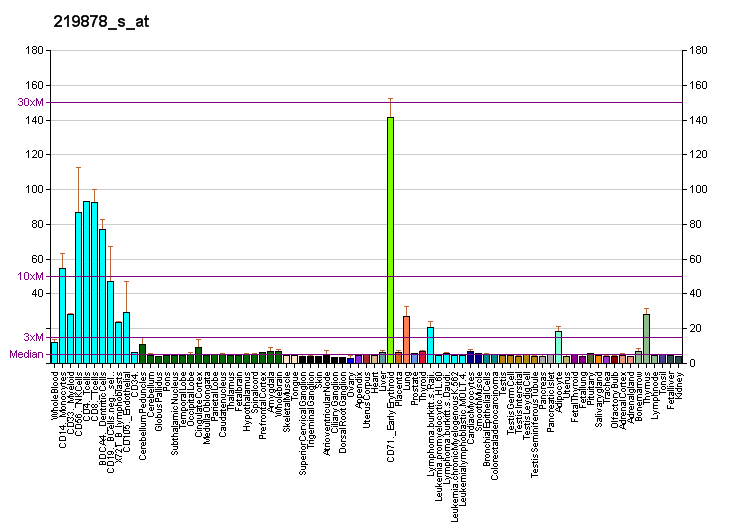
RNA expression pattern
Bgee	Human / Mouse (ortholog); Top expressed in: right hemisphere of cerebellum; granulocyte; right lung; mucosa of transverse colon; right frontal lobe; left lobe of thyroid gland; body of pancreas; right lobe of thyroid gland; monocyte; ganglionic eminence / Top expressed in: Rostral migratory stream; molar; thymus; granulocyte; blood; ankle; hair follicle; mesenteric lymph nodes; external carotid artery; Region I of hippocampus proper; More reference expression data
BioGPS	More reference expression data
Gene ontology
Molecular function	RNA polymerase II cis-regulatory region sequence-specific DNA binding; DNA binding; DNA-binding transcription activator activity, RNA polymerase II-specific; protein binding; metal ion binding; nucleic acid binding; DNA-binding transcription factor activity, RNA polymerase II-specific
Cellular component	nucleus
Biological process	regulation of transcription, DNA-templated; transcription by RNA polymerase II; positive regulation of transcription by RNA polymerase II; negative regulation of cell population proliferation; negative regulation of erythrocyte differentiation; transcription, DNA-templated; regulation of transcription by RNA polymerase II
Sources:Amigo / QuickGO
Orthologs
Databases	NCBI: entry; OMA: entry
Species	Human	Mouse
Entrez	51621	50794
Ensembl	ENSG00000169926; ENSG00000275746	ENSMUSG00000052040
UniProt	Q9Y2Y9	Q9JJZ6
RefSeq (mRNA)	NM_001302461; NM_015995	NM_021366
RefSeq (protein)	NP_001289390; NP_057079	NP_067341
Location (UCSC)	Chr 15: 31.33 – 31.44 Mb	Chr 7: 63.54 – 63.59 Mb
PubMed search
- Wikidata
View/Edit Human	View/Edit Mouse

Kruppel-like factor 13, also known as KLF13, is a protein that in humans is encoded by the KLF13 gene.

There is some evidence for KLF13 having a role in obesity. A methylation site, cg07814318, within the first intron of KLF13 has been associated with obesity and orexigenic processes. Ghrelin levels also positively correlated with methylation levels of cg07814318. Moreover, expression levels of KLF13 were decreased and increased in the brains of starved and obese mice, respectively.

== Function ==
KLF13 belongs to a family of transcription factors that contain 3 classical zinc finger DNA-binding domains consisting of a zinc atom tetrahedrally coordinated by 2 cysteines and 2 histidines (C2H2 motif). These transcription factors bind to GC-rich sequences and related GT and CACCC boxes.

KLF13 was first described as the RANTES factor of late activated T lymphocytes (RFLAT)-1. It regulates the expression of the chemokine RANTES in T lymphocytes. It functions as a lynchpin, inducing a large enhanceosome. KLF13 knock-out mice show a defect in lymphocyte survival as KLF13 is a regulator of Bcl-xL expression.

== Interactions ==
KLF13 has been shown to interact with CREB-binding protein, Heat shock protein 47 and PCAF.

== See also ==
- Kruppel-like factors
