= PCAF =

Protein-coding gene in humans

KAT2B
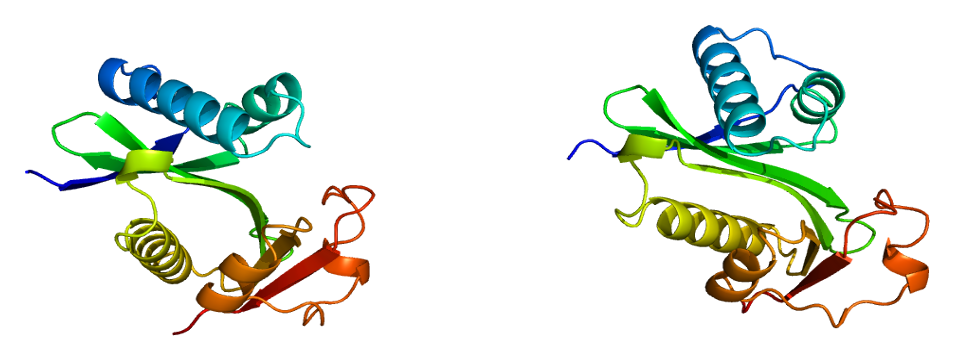

Identifiers
- Aliases: KAT2B, CAF, P/CAF, PCAF, lysine acetyltransferase 2B
- External IDs: OMIM: 602303; MGI: 1343094; GeneCards: KAT2B
Available structures
PDB	Ortholog search: PDBe RCSB
PDB	List of PDB id codes 1CM0, 1JM4, 1N72, 1WUG, 1WUM, 1ZS5, 2RNW, 2RNX, 3GG3, 4NSQ, 5FE2, 5FE4, 5FDZ, 5FE8, 5FE5, 5FE1, 5FE7, 5FE9, 5FE3, 5FE0, 5FE6
Enzyme activity
EC #	BRENDA	ExPASy	KEGG	MetaCyc
2.3.1.48	↗	↗	↗	↗
2.3.1.57	↗	↗	↗	↗

Gene location (Human)
Chr.	Chromosome 3 (human)
Band	3p24.3	Start	20,040,446 bp
Band	3p24.3	End	20,154,404 bp

Gene location (Mouse)
Chr.	Chromosome 17 (mouse)
Band	17 C|17 27.86 cM	Start	53,873,889 bp
Band	17 C|17 27.86 cM	End	53,979,748 bp
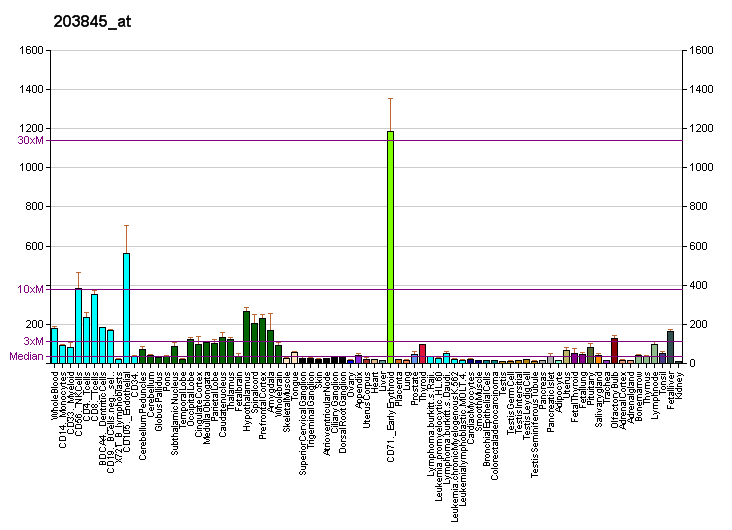
RNA expression pattern
Bgee	Human / Mouse (ortholog); Top expressed in: external globus pallidus; trabecular bone; buccal mucosa cell; corpus callosum; Achilles tendon; subthalamic nucleus; pars reticulata; amniotic fluid; Skeletal muscle tissue of rectus abdominis; pars compacta / Top expressed in: retinal pigment epithelium; nasal epithelium; olfactory epithelium; Epithelium of choroid plexus; iris; seminal vesicula; vestibular membrane of cochlear duct; gastrula; extensor digitorum longus muscle; ankle; More reference expression data
BioGPS	More reference expression data
Gene ontology
Molecular function	transferase activity; RNA polymerase II transcription regulatory region sequence-specific DNA binding; transcription coregulator activity; protein binding; acyltransferase activity; histone acetyltransferase activity; cyclin-dependent protein serine/threonine kinase inhibitor activity; protein kinase binding; chromatin binding; lysine N-acetyltransferase activity, acting on acetyl phosphate as donor; transcription coactivator activity; transcription factor binding; histone deacetylase binding; acetyltransferase activity; protein-containing complex binding; peptide-lysine-N-acetyltransferase activity; diamine N-acetyltransferase activity
Cellular component	I band; nucleoplasm; histone acetyltransferase complex; A band; actomyosin; kinetochore; nucleus; cytoplasm; centrosome; microtubule organizing center; cytoskeleton; protein-containing complex
Biological process	Notch signaling pathway; regulation of protein ADP-ribosylation; epigenetic maintenance of chromatin in transcription-competent conformation; chromatin remodeling; regulation of transcription, DNA-templated; negative regulation of cyclin-dependent protein serine/threonine kinase activity; rhythmic process; N-terminal peptidyl-lysine acetylation; transcription, DNA-templated; positive regulation of transcription, DNA-templated; histone acetylation; histone H3 acetylation; cellular response to insulin stimulus; histone H3-K9 acetylation; cell cycle; transcription initiation from RNA polymerase II promoter; viral process; peptidyl-lysine acetylation; negative regulation of cell population proliferation; positive regulation of transcription by RNA polymerase II; internal peptidyl-lysine acetylation; regulation of megakaryocyte differentiation; protein acetylation; positive regulation of transcription of Notch receptor target; development of the heart; positive regulation of Notch signaling pathway; negative regulation of centriole replication; limb development; protein deubiquitination
Sources:Amigo / QuickGO
Orthologs
Databases	NCBI: entry; OMA: entry
Species	Human	Mouse
Entrez	8850	18519
Ensembl	ENSG00000114166	ENSMUSG00000000708
UniProt	Q92831	Q9JHD1
RefSeq (mRNA)	NM_003884	NM_001190846; NM_020005
RefSeq (protein)	NP_003875	NP_001177775; NP_064389
Location (UCSC)	Chr 3: 20.04 – 20.15 Mb	Chr 17: 53.87 – 53.98 Mb
PubMed search
- Wikidata
View/Edit Human	View/Edit Mouse

P300/CBP-associated factor (PCAF), also known as K(lysine) acetyltransferase 2B (KAT2B), is a human gene and transcriptional coactivator associated with p53.

== Structure ==
Several domains of PCAF can act independently or in unison to enable its functions. PCAF has separate acetyltransferase and E3 ubiquitin ligase domains as well as a bromodomain for interaction with other proteins. PCAF also possesses sites for its own acetylation and ubiquitination.

== Function ==
CBP and p300 are large nuclear proteins that bind to many sequence-specific factors involved in cell growth and/or differentiation, including c-jun and the adenoviral oncoprotein E1A. The protein encoded by the PCAF gene associates with p300/CBP. It has in vitro and in vivo binding activity with CBP and p300, and competes with E1A for binding sites in p300/CBP. It has histone acetyl transferase activity with core histones and nucleosome core particles, indicating that this protein plays a direct role in transcriptional regulation.

== Regulation ==
The acetyltransferase activity and cellular location of PCAF are regulated through acetylation of PCAF itself. PCAF may be autoacetylated (acetylated by itself) or by p300. Acetylation leads to migration to the nucleus and enhances its acetyltransferase activity. PCAF interacts with and is deacetylated by HDAC3, leading to a reduction in PCAF acetyltransferase activity and cytoplasmic localisation.

== Protein interactions ==
PCAF forms complexes with numerous proteins that guide its activity. For example PCAF is recruited by ATF to acetylate histones and promote transcription of ATF4 target genes.

== Targets ==
There are various protein targets of PCAF's acetyltransferase activity including transcription factors such as Fli1, p53 and numerous histone residues. Hdm2, itself a ubiquitin ligase that targets p53, has also been demonstrated to be a target of the ubiquitin-ligase activity of PCAF.

== Interactions ==
PCAF has been shown to interact with:

- BRCA2,
- CTNNB1,
- CREBBP,
- EVI1,
- HNF1A,
- IRF1,
- IRF2,
- KLF13,
- Mdm2
- Myc,
- NCOA1,
- POLR2A,
- RBPJ,
- TCF3,
- TRRAP, and
- TWIST1.

== See also ==
- Transcription coregulator
- Acetyltransferase
