= TRAF3 =

Protein-coding gene in the species Homo sapiens

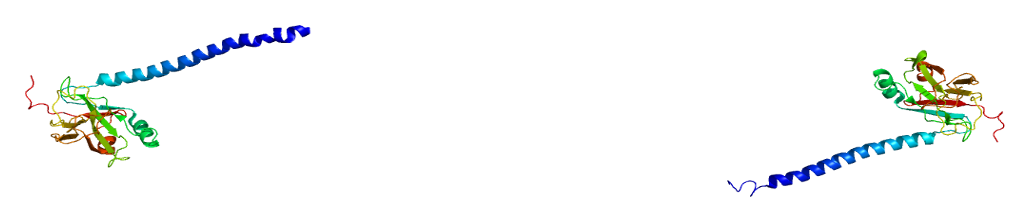

Identifiers
- Aliases: TRAF3, CAP-1, CAP1, CD40bp, CRAF1, IIAE5, LAP1, TNF receptor associated factor 3, RNF118
- External IDs: OMIM: 601896; MGI: 108041; GeneCards: TRAF3
Available structures
PDB	Ortholog search: PDBe RCSB
PDB	List of PDB id codes 1FLK, 1FLL, 1KZZ, 1L0A, 1RF3, 1ZMS, 2ECY, 2GKW
Enzyme activity
EC #	BRENDA	ExPASy	KEGG	MetaCyc
2.3.2.27	↗	↗	↗	↗

Gene location (Human)
Chr.	Chromosome 14 (human)
Band	14q32.32	Start	102,777,449 bp
Band	14q32.32	End	102,911,500 bp

Gene location (Mouse)
Chr.	Chromosome 12 (mouse)
Band	12 F1|12 60.94 cM	Start	111,132,804 bp
Band	12 F1|12 60.94 cM	End	111,233,587 bp
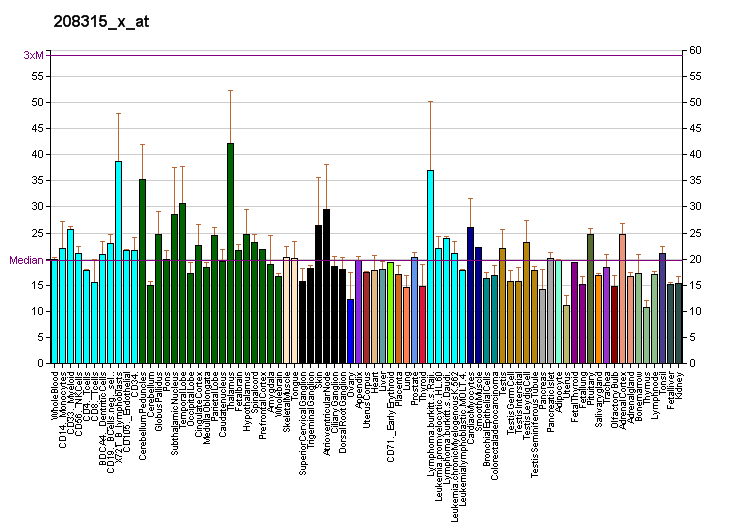
RNA expression pattern
Bgee	Human / Mouse (ortholog); Top expressed in: cartilage tissue; monocyte; Brodmann area 46; appendix; middle temporal gyrus; granulocyte; postcentral gyrus; lymph node; testicle; tibia / Top expressed in: CA3 field; vestibular sensory epithelium; ventral tegmental area; Epithelium of choroid plexus; central gray substance of midbrain; entorhinal cortex; subiculum; dorsomedial hypothalamic nucleus; lacrimal gland; superior colliculus; More reference expression data
BioGPS	More reference expression data
Gene ontology
Molecular function	zinc ion binding; signal transducer activity; metal ion binding; protein binding; thioesterase binding; protein phosphatase binding; protein kinase binding; ubiquitin protein ligase binding; transferase activity; ubiquitin-protein transferase activity; tumor necrosis factor receptor binding
Cellular component	cytoplasm; cytosol; endosome; mitochondrion; cytoplasmic side of plasma membrane; CD40 receptor complex; protein-containing complex
Biological process	regulation of apoptotic process; Toll signaling pathway; immune system process; TRIF-dependent toll-like receptor signaling pathway; protein ubiquitination; negative regulation of NF-kappaB transcription factor activity; regulation of proteolysis; apoptotic process; toll-like receptor signaling pathway; regulation of cytokine production; signal transduction; regulation of interferon-beta production; innate immune response; tumor necrosis factor-mediated signaling pathway; regulation of defense response to virus; protein deubiquitination
Sources:Amigo / QuickGO
Orthologs
Databases	NCBI: entry; OMA: entry
Species	Human	Mouse
Entrez	7187	22031
Ensembl	ENSG00000131323	ENSMUSG00000021277
UniProt	Q13114	Q60803
RefSeq (mRNA)	NM_001199427; NM_003300; NM_145725; NM_145726; NM_001385142 NM_001385143	NM_001048206; NM_001286122; NM_011632; NM_001364364
RefSeq (protein)	NP_001186356; NP_003291; NP_663777; NP_663778	NP_001273051; NP_035762; NP_001351293
Location (UCSC)	Chr 14: 102.78 – 102.91 Mb	Chr 12: 111.13 – 111.23 Mb
PubMed search
- Wikidata
View/Edit Human	View/Edit Mouse

TNF receptor-associated factor (TRAF3) is a protein that in humans is encoded by the TRAF3 gene.

== Function ==
The protein encoded by this gene is a member of the TNF receptor associated factor (TRAF) protein family. TRAF proteins associate with, and mediate the signal transduction from, members of the TNF receptor (TNFR) superfamily. This protein participates in the signal transduction of CD40, a TNFR family member important for the activation of the immune response. This protein is found to be a critical component of the lymphotoxin-beta receptor (LTbetaR) signaling complex, which induces NF-kappaB activation and cell death initiated by LTbeta ligation. Epstein-Barr virus-encoded latent infection membrane protein-1 (LMP1) can interact with this and several other members of the TRAF family, which may be essential for the oncogenic effects of LMP1. Three alternatively spliced transcript variants encoding two distinct isoforms have been reported.

== Interactions ==
TRAF3 has been shown to interact with:

- CD27,
- CD40,
- Caspase 3
- Lymphotoxin beta receptor,
- Nucleoporin 62,
- RANK,
- TANK, and
- TNFSF14.

== Clinical significance ==
=== TRAF3 Haploinsufficiency Syndrome ===
Haploinsufficiency of TRAF3 in humans is associated with various immunodeficiency and autoimmunity diseases.
