= IRF8 =

Protein-coding gene in the species Homo sapiens

Identifiers
- Aliases: IRF8, H-ICSBP, ICSBP, ICSBP1, IMD32A, IMD32B, IRF-8, interferon regulatory factor 8
- External IDs: OMIM: 601565; MGI: 96395; GeneCards: IRF8

Gene location (Human)
Chr.	Chromosome 16 (human)
Band	16q24.1	Start	85,899,116 bp
Band	16q24.1	End	85,922,606 bp

Gene location (Mouse)
Chr.	Chromosome 8 (mouse)
Band	8 E1|8 70.05 cM	Start	121,463,097 bp
Band	8 E1|8 70.05 cM	End	121,483,433 bp
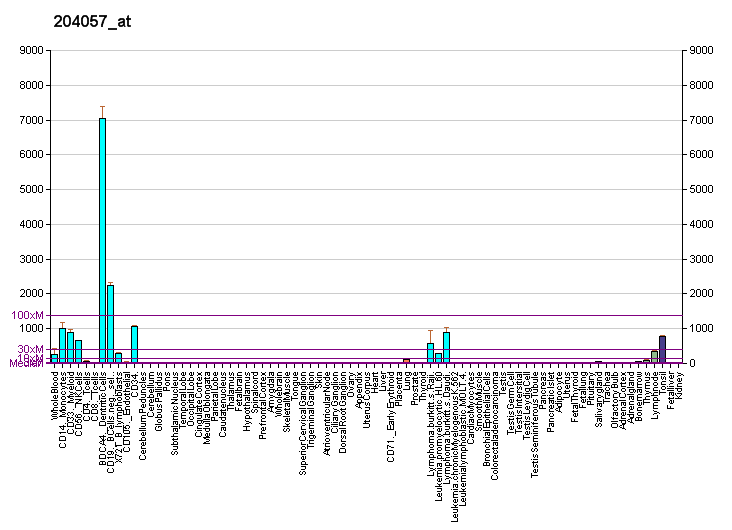
RNA expression pattern
Bgee	Human / Mouse (ortholog); Top expressed in: monocyte; lymph node; spleen; secondary oocyte; appendix; granulocyte; blood; epithelium of colon; bone marrow; rectum / Top expressed in: Ileal epithelium; mesenteric lymph nodes; spleen; bone marrow; tibiofemoral joint; submandibular gland; crypt of lieberkuhn of small intestine; jejunum; stroma of bone marrow; subcutaneous adipose tissue; More reference expression data
BioGPS	More reference expression data
Gene ontology
Molecular function	DNA binding; DNA-binding transcription factor activity; protein binding; transcription factor activity, RNA polymerase II distal enhancer sequence-specific binding; RNA polymerase II transcription regulatory region sequence-specific DNA binding; RNA polymerase II cis-regulatory region sequence-specific DNA binding; DNA-binding transcription repressor activity, RNA polymerase II-specific; DNA-binding transcription factor activity, RNA polymerase II-specific
Cellular component	cytosol; nucleoplasm; nucleus; cytoplasm
Biological process	myeloid cell differentiation; regulation of transcription, DNA-templated; response to bacterium; positive regulation of interleukin-12 production; interferon-gamma-mediated signaling pathway; positive regulation of interferon-gamma production; positive regulation of transcription initiation from RNA polymerase II promoter; transcription, DNA-templated; positive regulation of transcription, DNA-templated; defense response to bacterium; type I interferon signaling pathway; immune response; phagocytosis; cellular response to lipopolysaccharide; defense response to protozoan; negative regulation of transcription by RNA polymerase II; positive regulation of transcription by RNA polymerase II; cellular response to interferon-gamma; autophagy; immune system process
Sources:Amigo / QuickGO
Orthologs
Databases	NCBI: entry; OMA: entry
Species	Human	Mouse
Entrez	3394	15900
Ensembl	ENSG00000140968	ENSMUSG00000041515
UniProt	Q02556	P23611
RefSeq (mRNA)	NM_002163; NM_001363907; NM_001363908	NM_001301811; NM_008320
RefSeq (protein)	NP_002154; NP_001350836; NP_001350837	NP_001288740; NP_032346
Location (UCSC)	Chr 16: 85.9 – 85.92 Mb	Chr 8: 121.46 – 121.48 Mb
PubMed search
- Wikidata
View/Edit Human	View/Edit Mouse

Interferon regulatory factor 8 (IRF8) also known as interferon consensus sequence-binding protein (ICSBP), is a protein that in humans is encoded by the IRF8 gene. IRF8 is a transcription factor that plays critical roles in the regulation of lineage commitment and in myeloid cell maturation including the decision for a common myeloid progenitor (CMP) to differentiate into a monocyte precursor cell.

== Function ==
Interferon Consensus Sequence-binding protein (ICSBP) is a transcription factor of the interferon regulatory factor (IRF) family. Proteins of this family are composed of a conserved DNA-binding domain in the N-terminal region and a divergent C-terminal region that serves as the regulatory domain. The IRF family proteins bind to the IFN-stimulated response element (ISRE) and regulate expression of genes stimulated by type I IFNs, namely IFN-α and IFN-β. IRF family proteins also control expression of IFN-α and IFN-β-regulated genes that are induced by viral infection.

== Knockout studies ==
IFN-producing cells (mIPCs) were absent in all lymphoid organs from ICSBP knockout (KO) mice, as revealed by lack of CD11c^{low}B220^{+}Ly6C^{+}CD11b^{−} cells. In parallel, CD11c^{+} cells isolated from ICSBP KO spleens were unable to produce type I IFNs in response to viral stimulation. ICSBP KO mice also displayed a marked reduction of the DC subset expressing the CD8alpha marker (CD8alpha^{+} DCs) in spleen, lymph nodes, and thymus. Moreover, ICSBP-deficient CD8alpha^{+} DCs exhibited a markedly impaired phenotype when compared with WT DCs. They expressed very low levels of costimulatory molecules (intercellular adhesion molecule ICAM1, CD40, CD80, CD86) and of the T cell area-homing chemokine receptor CCR7.

== Clinical significance ==
In myeloid cells, IRF8 regulates the expression of Bax and Fas to regulate apoptosis. In chronic myelogenous leukemia (CML), IRF8 regulates acid ceramidase to mediate CML apoptosis.

IRF8 is highly expressed in myeloid cells and was originally identified in as a critical lineage-specific transcription factor for myeloid cell differentiation, recent studies, however, have shown that IRF8 is also constitutively expressed in non-hematopoietic cancer cells, albeit at a lower level. Furthermore, IRF8 can also be up-regulated by IFN-γ in non-hemotopoietic cells. IRF8 mediates the expression of Fas, Bax, FLIP, Jak1 and STAT1 to mediate apoptosis in non-hemotopoietic cancer cells.

Analysis of human cancer genomics database revealed that IRF8 is not significantly focally amplified across the entire dataset of 3131 tumors, but is significantly focally deleted across the entire dataset of 3131 tumors, suggesting that IRF8 is potentially a tumor suppressor in humans. Molecular analysis indicated that the IRF8 gene promoter is hypermethylated in human colon carcinoma cells, suggesting that these cells might use DNA methylation to silence IRF8 expression to advance the disease.

== Interactions ==
IRF8 has been shown to interact with IRF1 and COPS2.

== See also ==
- Interferon regulatory factors

== Illustrations ==
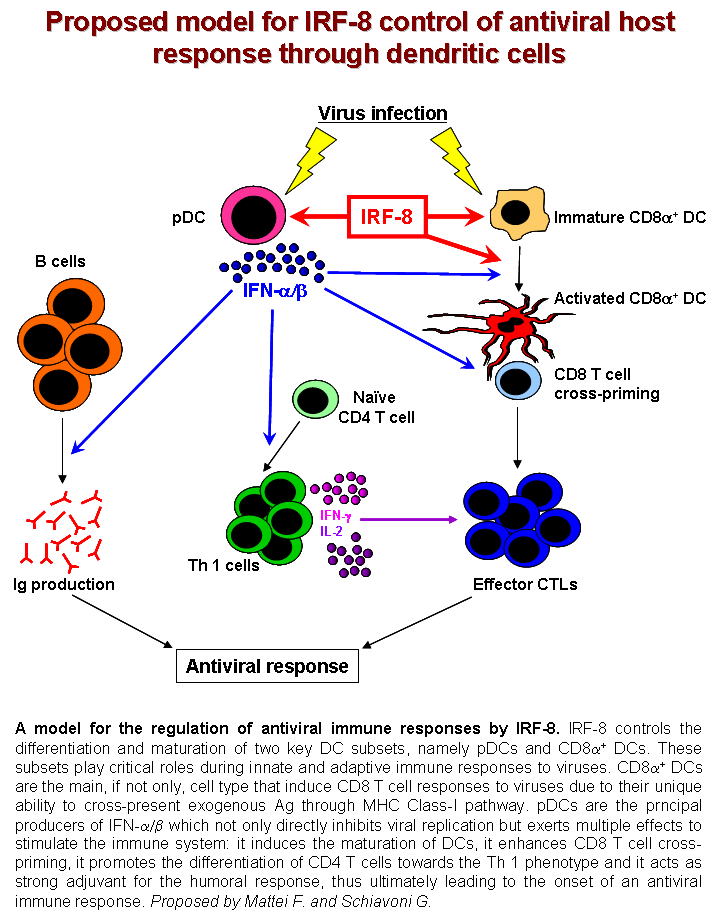
