= IRF3 =

Protein-coding gene in the species Homo sapiens

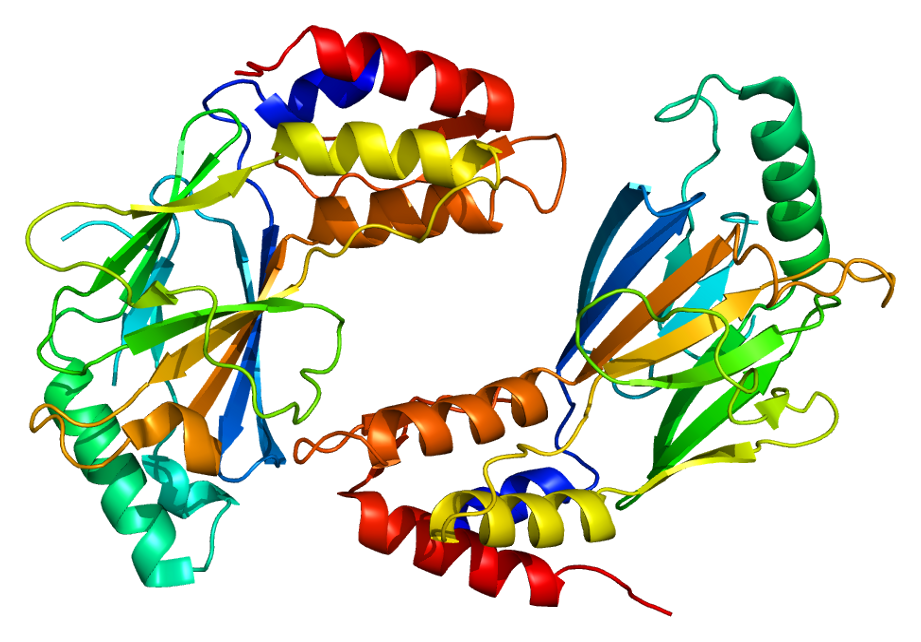

Identifiers
- Aliases: IRF3, entrez:3661, IIAE7, interferon regulatory factor 3
- External IDs: OMIM: 603734; MGI: 1859179; GeneCards: IRF3
Available structures
PDB	Ortholog search: PDBe RCSB
PDB	List of PDB id codes 3QU6, 1J2F, 1QWT, 1T2K, 1ZOQ, 2O61, 2O6G, 2PI0, 3A77, 5JEO, 5JEK, 5JER, 5JEM, 5JEL, 5JEJ

Gene location (Human)
Chr.	Chromosome 19 (human)
Band	19q13.33	Start	49,659,569 bp
Band	19q13.33	End	49,665,875 bp

Gene location (Mouse)
Chr.	Chromosome 7 (mouse)
Band	7|7 B3	Start	44,647,072 bp
Band	7|7 B3	End	44,652,272 bp
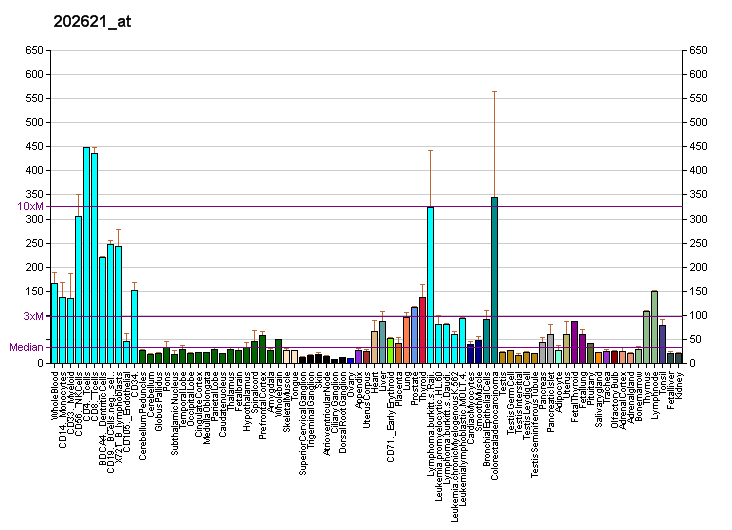
RNA expression pattern
Bgee	Human / Mouse (ortholog); Top expressed in: granulocyte; right uterine tube; mucosa of transverse colon; spleen; right lobe of thyroid gland; canal of the cervix; left lobe of thyroid gland; anterior pituitary; lymph node; ectocervix / Top expressed in: neural layer of retina; spermatocyte; lip; granulocyte; tibiofemoral joint; thymus; yolk sac; right kidney; crypt of lieberkuhn of small intestine; vestibular membrane of cochlear duct; More reference expression data
BioGPS	More reference expression data
Gene ontology
Molecular function	DNA binding; protein homodimerization activity; DNA-binding transcription factor activity; transcription coregulator activity; DNA-binding transcription repressor activity, RNA polymerase II-specific; protein binding; protein domain specific binding; RNA polymerase II cis-regulatory region sequence-specific DNA binding; DNA-binding transcription activator activity, RNA polymerase II-specific; sequence-specific DNA binding; identical protein binding; DNA-binding transcription factor activity, RNA polymerase II-specific
Cellular component	cytoplasm; nucleoplasm; nucleus; cytosol
Biological process	apoptotic process; positive regulation of type I interferon-mediated signaling pathway; macrophage apoptotic process; regulation of transcription, DNA-templated; response to bacterium; response to exogenous dsRNA; positive regulation of interferon-alpha production; MDA-5 signaling pathway; interferon-gamma-mediated signaling pathway; immune system process; negative regulation of transcription by RNA polymerase II; transcription by RNA polymerase II; cellular response to dsRNA; transcription, DNA-templated; cellular response to DNA damage stimulus; TRIF-dependent toll-like receptor signaling pathway; response to lipopolysaccharide; defense response to virus; type I interferon signaling pathway; positive regulation of I-kappaB kinase/NF-kappaB signaling; negative regulation of type I interferon production; programmed necrotic cell death; viral process; cellular response to lipopolysaccharide; positive regulation of type I interferon production; lipopolysaccharide-mediated signaling pathway; positive regulation of interferon-beta production; innate immune response; regulation of type I interferon production; positive regulation of transcription by RNA polymerase II; negative regulation of defense response to virus by host; regulation of gene expression; regulation of inflammatory response; cellular response to exogenous dsRNA; positive regulation of transcription, DNA-templated
Sources:Amigo / QuickGO
Orthologs
Databases	NCBI: entry; OMA: entry
Species	Human	Mouse
Entrez	3661	54131
Ensembl	ENSG00000126456	ENSMUSG00000003184
UniProt	Q14653	P70671
RefSeq (mRNA)	NM_001197122; NM_001197123; NM_001197124; NM_001197125; NM_001197126 NM_001197127; NM_001197128; NM_001571	NM_016849
RefSeq (protein)	NP_001184051; NP_001184052; NP_001184053; NP_001184054; NP_001184055 NP_001184056; NP_001184057; NP_001562; NP_001184053.1; NP_001184056.1; NP_001184057.1	NP_058545
Location (UCSC)	Chr 19: 49.66 – 49.67 Mb	Chr 7: 44.65 – 44.65 Mb
PubMed search
- Wikidata
View/Edit Human	View/Edit Mouse

Interferon regulatory factor 3, also known as IRF3, is an interferon regulatory factor.

== Function ==
IRF3 is a member of the interferon regulatory transcription factor (IRF) family. IRF3 was originally discovered as a homolog of IRF1 and IRF2. IRF3 has been further characterized and shown to contain several functional domains including a nuclear export signal, a DNA-binding domain, a C-terminal IRF association domain and several regulatory phosphorylation sites. IRF3 is found in an inactive cytoplasmic form that upon serine/threonine phosphorylation forms a complex with CREBBP. The complex translocates into the nucleus for the transcriptional activation of interferons alpha and beta, and further interferon-induced genes.

IRF3 plays an important role in the innate immune system's response to viral infection. Aggregated MAVS have been found to activate IRF3 dimerization. A 2015 study shows phosphorylation of innate immune adaptor proteins MAVS, STING and TRIF at a conserved pLxIS motif recruits and specifies IRF3 phosphorylation and activation by the Serine/threonine-protein kinase TBK1, thereby activating the production of type-I interferons. Another study has shown that IRF3-/- knockouts protect from myocardial infarction. The same study identified IRF3 and the type I IFN response as a potential therapeutic target for post-myocardial infarction cardioprotection.

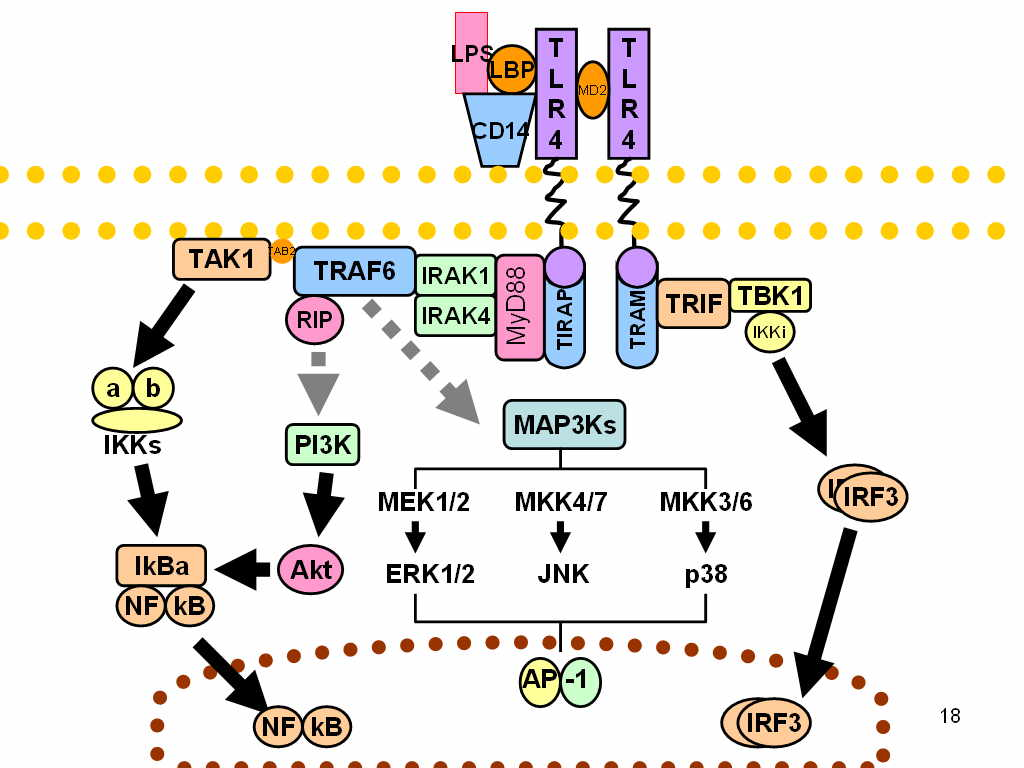
Signaling pathway of toll-like receptors. Dashed grey lines represent unknown associations

== Interactions ==
IRF3 has been shown to interact with IRF7.
