= IRF2 =

Protein-coding gene in the species Homo sapiens

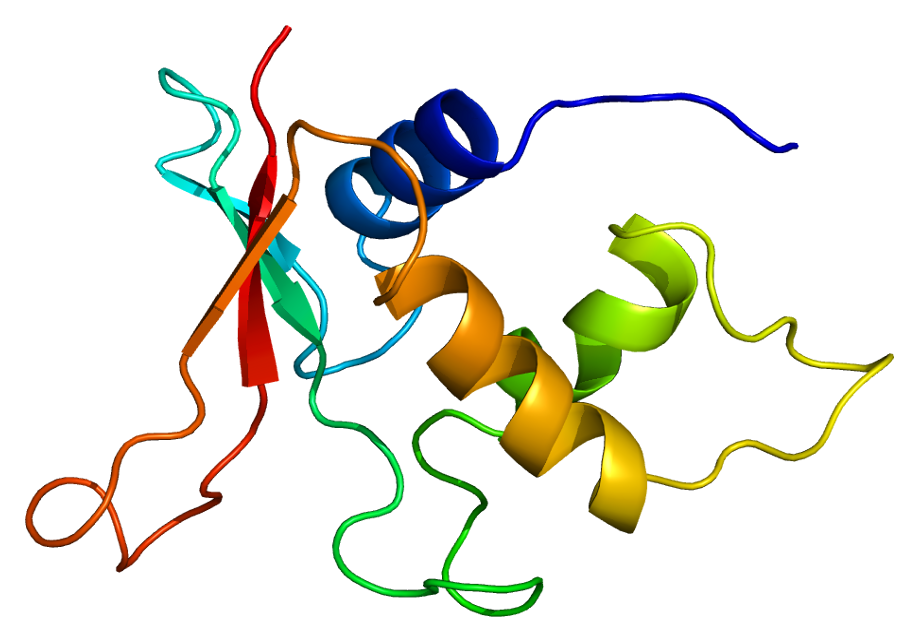

Identifiers
- Aliases: IRF2, IRF-2, interferon regulatory factor 2
- External IDs: OMIM: 147576; MGI: 96591; GeneCards: IRF2
Available structures
PDB	Ortholog search: PDBe RCSB
PDB	List of PDB id codes 1IRF, 1IRG, 2IRF

Gene location (Human)
Chr.	Chromosome 4 (human)
Band	4q35.1	Start	184,385,702 bp
Band	4q35.1	End	184,474,558 bp

Gene location (Mouse)
Chr.	Chromosome 8 (mouse)
Band	8|8 B1.1	Start	47,192,767 bp
Band	8|8 B1.1	End	47,300,493 bp
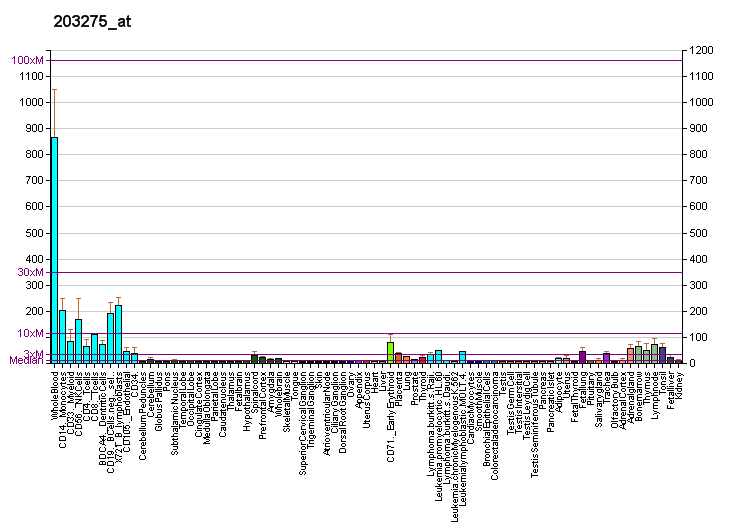
RNA expression pattern
Bgee	Human / Mouse (ortholog); Top expressed in: monocyte; blood; Achilles tendon; granulocyte; olfactory zone of nasal mucosa; appendix; spleen; lymph node; rectum; right adrenal cortex / Top expressed in: granulocyte; blood; left colon; spleen; left lobe of liver; mesenteric lymph nodes; muscle of thigh; thymus; duodenum; tail of embryo; More reference expression data
BioGPS	More reference expression data
Gene ontology
Molecular function	DNA-binding transcription factor activity; DNA-binding transcription activator activity, RNA polymerase II-specific; DNA binding; RNA polymerase II transcription regulatory region sequence-specific DNA binding; protein binding; DNA-binding transcription factor activity, RNA polymerase II-specific
Cellular component	nucleus; focal adhesion; nucleoplasm; cytosol
Biological process	interferon-gamma-mediated signaling pathway; cell population proliferation; blood coagulation; regulation of transcription, DNA-templated; negative regulation of transcription by RNA polymerase II; type I interferon signaling pathway; transcription, DNA-templated; positive regulation of transcription by RNA polymerase II; transcription by RNA polymerase II; immune system process
Sources:Amigo / QuickGO
Orthologs
Databases	NCBI: entry; OMA: entry
Species	Human	Mouse
Entrez	3660	16363
Ensembl	ENSG00000168310	ENSMUSG00000031627
UniProt	P14316	P23906
RefSeq (mRNA)	NM_002199	NM_008391
RefSeq (protein)	NP_002190	NP_032417
Location (UCSC)	Chr 4: 184.39 – 184.47 Mb	Chr 8: 47.19 – 47.3 Mb
PubMed search
- Wikidata
View/Edit Human	View/Edit Mouse

Interferon regulatory factor 2 is a protein that in humans is encoded by the IRF2 gene.

== Function ==
IRF2 encodes interferon regulatory factor 2, a member of the interferon regulatory transcription factor (IRF) family. IRF2 competitively inhibits the IRF1-mediated transcriptional activation of interferons alpha and beta, and presumably other genes that employ IRF1 for transcription activation. However, IRF2 also functions as a transcriptional activator of histone H4.

== See also ==
- IRF1
- Interferon regulatory factors

== Interactions ==
IRF2 has been shown to interact with BRD7, EP300 and PCAF.
