= IRF1 =

Protein-coding gene in the species Homo sapiens

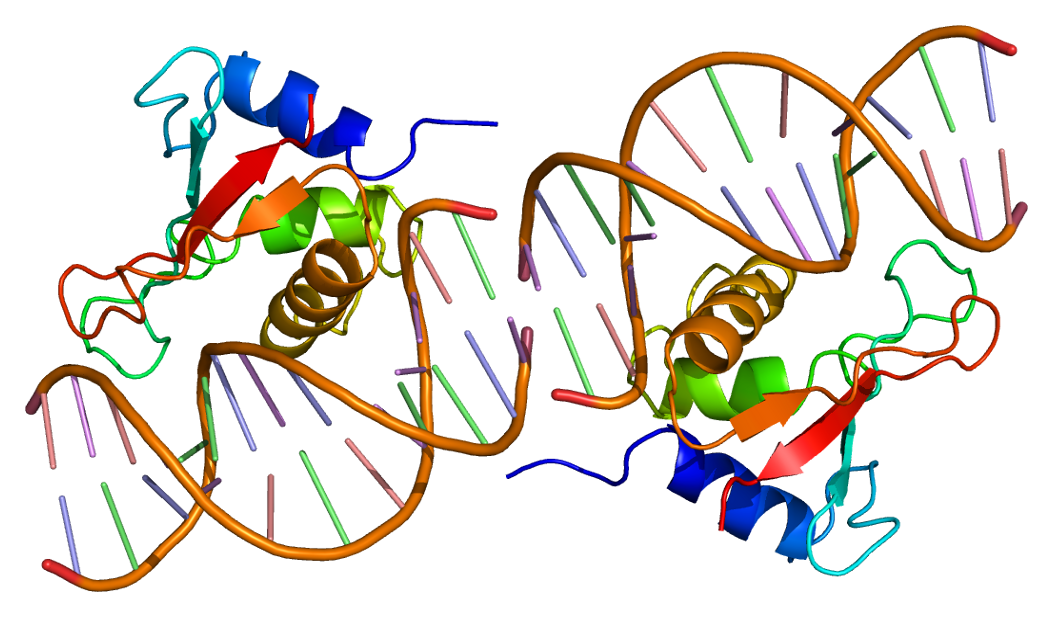

Identifiers
- Aliases: IRF1, IRF-1, MAR, interferon regulatory factor 1
- External IDs: OMIM: 147575; MGI: 96590; GeneCards: IRF1
Available structures
PDB	Ortholog search: PDBe RCSB
PDB	List of PDB id codes 1IF1

Gene location (Mouse)
Chr.	Chromosome 11 (mouse)
Band	11 B1.3|11 32.0 cM	Start	53,660,841 bp
Band	11 B1.3|11 32.0 cM	End	53,669,200 bp
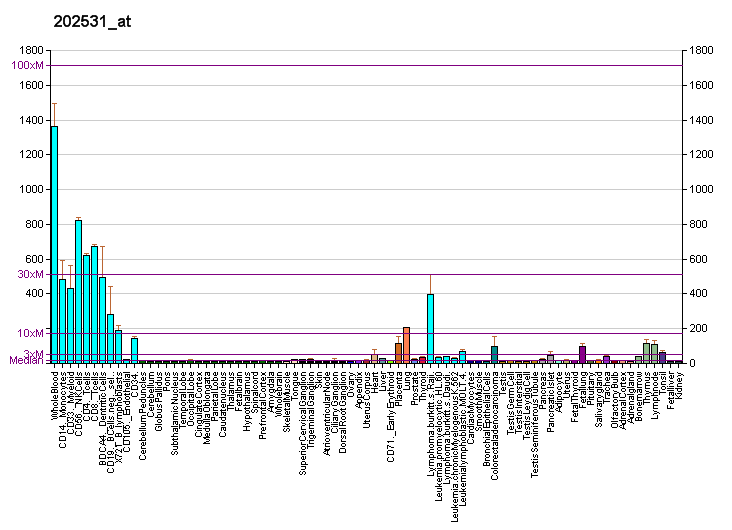
RNA expression pattern
Bgee	Human / Mouse (ortholog); n/a / Top expressed in: granulocyte; jejunum; mesenteric lymph nodes; duodenum; corneal stroma; large intestine; spleen; colon; ileum; primary oocyte
BioGPS	More reference expression data
Gene ontology
Molecular function	DNA binding; sequence-specific DNA binding; DNA-binding transcription factor activity; DNA-binding transcription activator activity, RNA polymerase II-specific; RNA polymerase II cis-regulatory region sequence-specific DNA binding; protein binding; DNA-binding transcription factor activity, RNA polymerase II-specific
Cellular component	cytoplasm; cytosol; nucleoplasm; nucleus
Biological process	apoptotic process; regulation of CD8-positive, alpha-beta T cell proliferation; CD8-positive, alpha-beta T cell differentiation; regulation of innate immune response; negative regulation of regulatory T cell differentiation; regulation of transcription, DNA-templated; cellular response to interferon-beta; interferon-gamma-mediated signaling pathway; immune system process; regulation of adaptive immune response; blood coagulation; regulation of MyD88-dependent toll-like receptor signaling pathway; transcription by RNA polymerase II; transcription, DNA-templated; regulation of cell cycle; positive regulation of transcription, DNA-templated; cellular response to mechanical stimulus; defense response to virus; type I interferon signaling pathway; regulation of immune response; regulation of gene expression; innate immune response; negative regulation of transcription, DNA-templated; positive regulation of type I interferon production; positive regulation of transcription by RNA polymerase II; negative regulation of cell population proliferation; positive regulation of interferon-beta production
Sources:Amigo / QuickGO
Orthologs
Databases	NCBI: entry; OMA: entry
Species	Human	Mouse
Entrez	3659	16362
Ensembl	ENSG00000125347	ENSMUSG00000018899
UniProt	P10914	P15314
RefSeq (mRNA)	NM_002198	NM_001159393; NM_001159396; NM_008390
RefSeq (protein)	NP_002189; NP_001341853; NP_001341854	NP_001152865; NP_001152868; NP_032416
Location (UCSC)	n/a	Chr 11: 53.66 – 53.67 Mb
PubMed search
- Wikidata
View/Edit Human	View/Edit Mouse

Interferon regulatory factor 1 is a protein that in humans is encoded by the IRF1 gene.

== Function ==
Interferon regulatory factor 1 was the first member of the interferon regulatory transcription factor (IRF) family identified. Initially described as a transcription factor able to activate expression of the cytokine Interferon beta, IRF-1 was subsequently shown to function as a transcriptional activator or repressor of a variety of target genes. IRF-1 regulates expression of target genes by binding to an interferon stimulated response element (ISRE) in their promoters. The IRF-1 protein binds to the ISRE via an N-terminal helix-turn-helix DNA binding domain, which is highly conserved among all IRF proteins.

Beyond its function as a transcription factor, IRF-1 has also been shown to trans-activate the tumour suppressor protein p53 through the recruitment of its co-factor p300.

IRF-1 has been shown to play roles in the immune response, regulating apoptosis, DNA damage and tumor suppression.

== Regulation ==
It has been shown that the extreme C-terminus of IRF-1 regulates its ability to activate transcription, nanobodies targeting this domain (MF1) are able to increase IRF-1 activity.

== Interactions ==
IRF1 has been shown to interact with:

- CHIP
- GAGE
- HSP70 / HSP90
- IRF8
- KPNA2
- MYD88
- PCAF
- STAT1
- TAT
- VEGFR2
- REDD2

== See also ==
- IRF2
- Interferon regulatory factors
