= AZI2 =

Protein-coding gene in the species Homo sapiens

Identifiers
- Aliases: AZI2, AZ2, NAP1, TILP, 5-azacytidine induced 2
- External IDs: OMIM: 609916; MGI: 1351332; HomoloGene: 8443; GeneCards: AZI2; OMA:AZI2 - orthologs

Gene location (Human)
| Chr. | Chromosome 3 (human) |
| Band | 3p24.1 | Start | 28,315,003 bp |
| Band | 3p24.1 | End | 28,349,050 bp |

Gene location (Mouse)
| Chr. | Chromosome 9 (mouse) |
| Band | 9|9 F3 | Start | 118,040,499 bp |
| Band | 9|9 F3 | End | 118,069,794 bp |
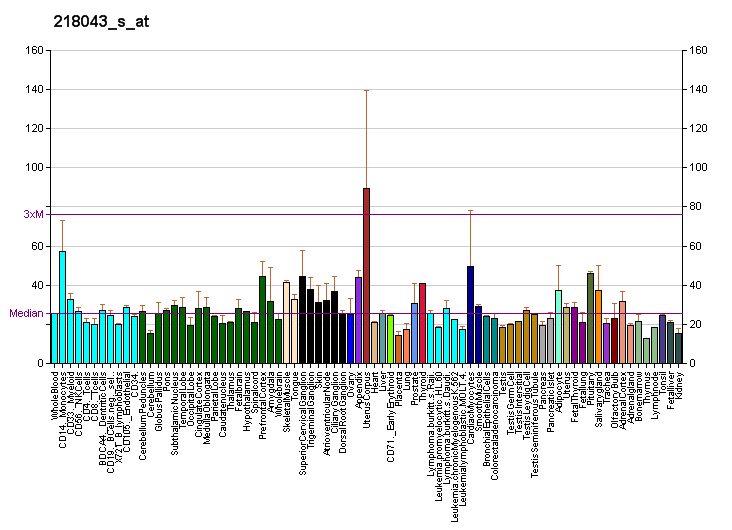
RNA expression pattern
| Bgee | Human / Mouse (ortholog); Top expressed in: stromal cell of endometrium; monocyte; mucosa of paranasal sinus; Achilles tendon; buccal mucosa cell; gastric mucosa; right lung; lower lobe of lung; ganglionic eminence; ventricular zone / Top expressed in: neural layer of retina; spermatid; genital tubercle; tail of embryo; spermatocyte; ventricular zone; dentate gyrus of hippocampal formation granule cell; parotid gland; atrioventricular valve; seminal vesicula; More reference expression data |
| BioGPS | More reference expression data |
Gene ontology
| Molecular function | protein binding |
| Cellular component | cytoplasm |
| Biological process | interleukin-6 production; dendritic cell differentiation; cytokine production; tumor necrosis factor production; interferon-alpha production; I-kappaB kinase/NF-kappaB signaling; T cell activation; dendritic cell proliferation; mitotic cell cycle; viral process |
Sources:Amigo / QuickGO
Orthologs
| Species | Human | Mouse |
| Entrez | 64343 | 27215 |
| Ensembl | ENSG00000163512 | ENSMUSG00000039285 |
| UniProt | Q9H6S1 | Q9QYP6 |
| RefSeq (mRNA) | NM_001134432; NM_001134433; NM_001271650; NM_022461; NM_203326 | NM_001048146; NM_001286507; NM_001286508; NM_013727 |
| RefSeq (protein) | NP_001127904; NP_001127905; NP_001258579; NP_071906 | NP_001041611; NP_001273436; NP_001273437; NP_038755 |
| Location (UCSC) | Chr 3: 28.32 – 28.35 Mb | Chr 9: 118.04 – 118.07 Mb |
| PubMed search |
- Wikidata
| View/Edit Human | View/Edit Mouse |

5-azacytidine-induced protein 2 is a protein that in humans is encoded by the AZI2 gene.

AZI2, or NAP1, contributes to the activation of NFKB (see MIM 164011)-dependent gene expression by activating IKK-related kinases, such as NAK (TBK1; MIM 604834) (Fujita et al., 2003).[supplied by OMIM]
