= IRF7 =

Protein-coding gene in the species Homo sapiens

Identifiers
- Aliases: IRF7, IRF-7H, IRF7A, IRF7B, IRF7C, IRF7H, IMD39, interferon regulatory factor 7, IRF-7
- External IDs: OMIM: 605047; MGI: 1859212; GeneCards: IRF7
Available structures
PDB	Ortholog search: PDBe RCSB
PDB	List of PDB id codes 2O61

Gene location (Human)
Chr.	Chromosome 11 (human)
Band	11p15.5	Start	612,553 bp
Band	11p15.5	End	615,983 bp

Gene location (Mouse)
Chr.	Chromosome 7 (mouse)
Band	7|7 F5	Start	140,842,619 bp
Band	7|7 F5	End	140,846,394 bp
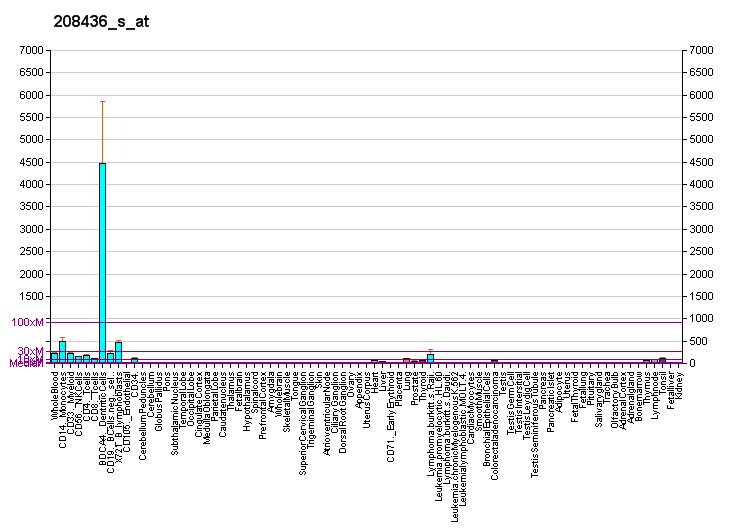
RNA expression pattern
Bgee	Human / Mouse (ortholog); Top expressed in: granulocyte; blood; right lobe of liver; spleen; monocyte; mucosa of transverse colon; apex of heart; lymph node; bone marrow; bone marrow cell / Top expressed in: granulocyte; gastrula; blood; mucous cell of stomach; ileum; jejunum; duodenum; large intestine; colon; thymus; More reference expression data
BioGPS	More reference expression data
Gene ontology
Molecular function	DNA binding; DNA-binding transcription factor activity; protein binding; RNA polymerase II core promoter sequence-specific DNA binding; transcription factor activity, RNA polymerase II core promoter proximal region sequence-specific binding; DNA-binding transcription factor activity, RNA polymerase II-specific; RNA polymerase II cis-regulatory region sequence-specific DNA binding; cis-regulatory region sequence-specific DNA binding
Cellular component	nucleoplasm; endosome membrane; nucleus; cytoplasm; cytosol
Biological process	positive regulation of type I interferon-mediated signaling pathway; regulation of transcription, DNA-templated; positive regulation of interferon-alpha production; MDA-5 signaling pathway; interferon-gamma-mediated signaling pathway; immune system process; regulation of adaptive immune response; response to virus; negative regulation of transcription by RNA polymerase II; transcription by RNA polymerase II; transcription, DNA-templated; regulation of type I interferon production; cellular response to DNA damage stimulus; TRIF-dependent toll-like receptor signaling pathway; positive regulation of transcription, DNA-templated; negative regulation of macrophage apoptotic process; type I interferon signaling pathway; immunoglobulin mediated immune response; establishment of viral latency; regulation of immune response; viral process; regulation of monocyte differentiation; positive regulation of transcription by RNA polymerase II; positive regulation of interferon-beta production; interferon-beta production; regulation of MyD88-independent toll-like receptor signaling pathway; positive regulation of type I interferon production; innate immune response; regulation of MyD88-dependent toll-like receptor signaling pathway; interferon-alpha production; defense response to virus; regulation of gene expression
Sources:Amigo / QuickGO
Orthologs
Databases	NCBI: entry; OMA: entry
Species	Human	Mouse
Entrez	3665	54123
Ensembl	ENSG00000276561; ENSG00000185507	ENSMUSG00000025498
UniProt	Q92985	P70434
RefSeq (mRNA)	NM_001572; NM_004029; NM_004030; NM_004031	NM_001252600; NM_001252601; NM_016850
RefSeq (protein)	NP_001563; NP_004020; NP_004022	NP_001239529; NP_001239530; NP_058546
Location (UCSC)	Chr 11: 0.61 – 0.62 Mb	Chr 7: 140.84 – 140.85 Mb
PubMed search
- Wikidata
View/Edit Human	View/Edit Mouse

Interferon regulatory factor 7, also known as IRF7, is a member of the interferon regulatory factor family of transcription factors.

== Function ==
IRF7 encodes interferon regulatory factor 7, a member of the interferon regulatory transcription factor (IRF) family. IRF7 has been shown to play a role in the transcriptional activation of virus-inducible cellular genes, including the type I interferon genes. In particular, IRF7 regulates many interferon-alpha genes. Constitutive expression of IRF7 is largely restricted to lymphoid tissue, largely plasmacytoid dendritic cells, whereas IRF7 is inducible in many tissues. Multiple IRF7 transcript variants have been identified, although the functional consequences of these have not yet been established.

The IRF7 pathway was shown to be silenced in some metastatic breast cancer cell lines, which may help the cells avoid the host immune response. Restoring IRF7 to these cell lines reduced metastases and increased host survival time in animal models.

The IRF7 gene and product were shown to be defective in a patient with severe susceptibility to H1N1 influenza, while susceptibility to other viral diseases such as CMV, RSV, and parainfluenza was unaffected.

== Interactions ==
IRF7 has been shown to interact with IRF3. Also, IRF7 has been shown to interact with Aryl Hydrocarbon Receptor Interacting Protein (AIP), which is a negative regulator for the antiviral pathway.

== See also ==
- Interferon regulatory factors
