= RIG-I-like receptor =

Receptor family

RIG-I-like receptors (retinoic acid-inducible gene-I-like receptors, RLRs) are a type of intracellular pattern recognition receptor involved in the recognition of viruses by the innate immune system. RIG-I (retinoic-acid inducible gene or DDX58) is the best characterized receptor within the RIG-I like receptor (RLR) family. Together with MDA5 (melanoma differentiation-associated 5) and LGP2 (laboratory of genetics and physiology 2), this family of cytoplasmic pattern recognition receptors (PRRs) are sentinels for intracellular viral RNA that is a product of viral infection. The RLR receptors provide frontline defence against viral infections in most tissues.

== RLR ligands ==
The RIG-I receptor prefers to bind short (<2000 bp) single- or double-stranded RNA carrying an uncapped 5' triphosphate and additional motifs such as poly-uridine rich RNA motifs. RIG-I triggers an immune response to RNA viruses from various families including the paramyxoviruses (e.g. measles), rhabdoviruses (e.g. vesicular stomatitis virus) and orthomyxoviruses (e.g. influenza A). MDA5 ligands are poorly characterized, but the preference is for long double-stranded RNA (>2000 bp), such as the replicative form of picornavirus RNA that is found in picornavirus-infected cells. LGP2 binds to blunt-ended double-stranded RNA of variable length, and also to RNA-bound MDA5 to regulate filament formation. The latter is linked to LGP2's recognition of picornaviruses (e.g. encephalomyocarditis virus), as per MDA5.

== Structural features ==
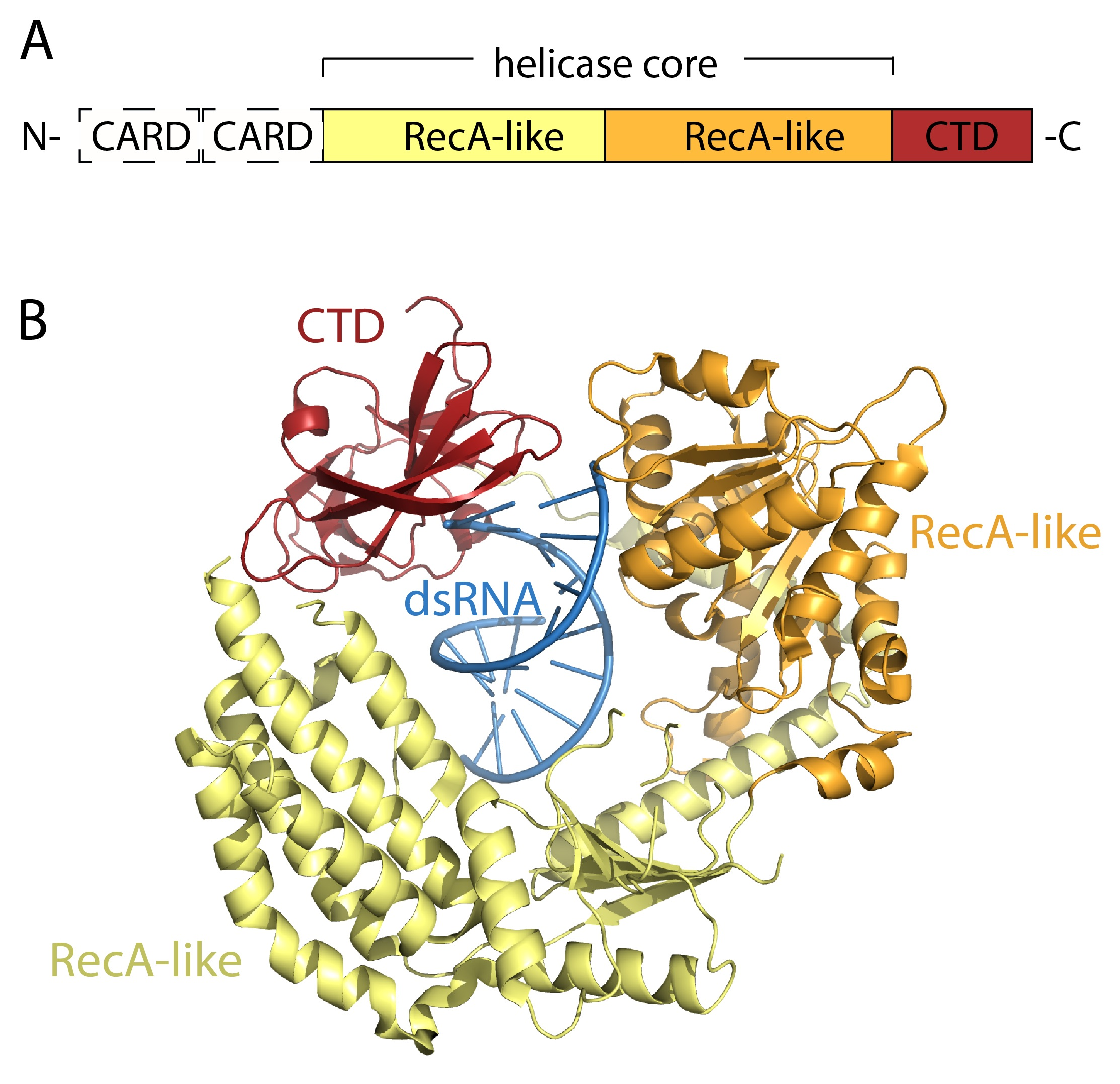
RIG-I domain architecture. (A) Schematic representation of full-length RIG-I. (B) X-ray crystal structure of RNA-bound RIG-I (PDB: 2YKG), excluding the CARD domains.

The RLR receptors are members of the DEAD-box (SF2) helicase family (despite containing a DExD/H motif, rather than the DEAD motif characteristic of the family) and share a common domain architecture. All contain a catalytic helicase core made up of two RecA-like domains. The catalytic helicase core contains at least 9 highly conserved sequence motifs that coordinate ATP and RNA binding and the hydrolysis of ATP to unwind RNA. A C-terminal domain (CTD; InterPro: IPR021673) follows the helicase core and this domain also binds viral RNA. Distinct RNA-binding loops within the CTD of the three RLRs dictate the type of RNA that they can bind. In addition to the helicase core and CTD, RIG-I and MDA5 have two N-terminal CARD (caspase active recruitment domains) that are essential to the initiation of downstream signaling. LGP2 is dissimilar to both RIG-I and MDA5 as it lacks the CARD signaling domains and instead is implicated as a positive and negative regulator of RIG-I and MDA5.

== Activation of signaling ==
In uninfected cells that are absent of viral RNA RIG-I exists in an inactive conformation in which the CARD domains are masked due to their interaction with the CTD. Upon binding RNA, RIG-I changes into a conformation in which the CARD domains are exposed and 'available' for signaling. Conversely, the MDA5 CARDs are unhindered in the absence of viral RNA. As a safeguard for RLR activation, the exposed RIG-I and MDA5 CARDs can undergo post-translational modifications (e.g. ubiquitination, phosphorylation) that either positively or negatively regulate downstream signaling.

== RIG-I antiviral signaling ==
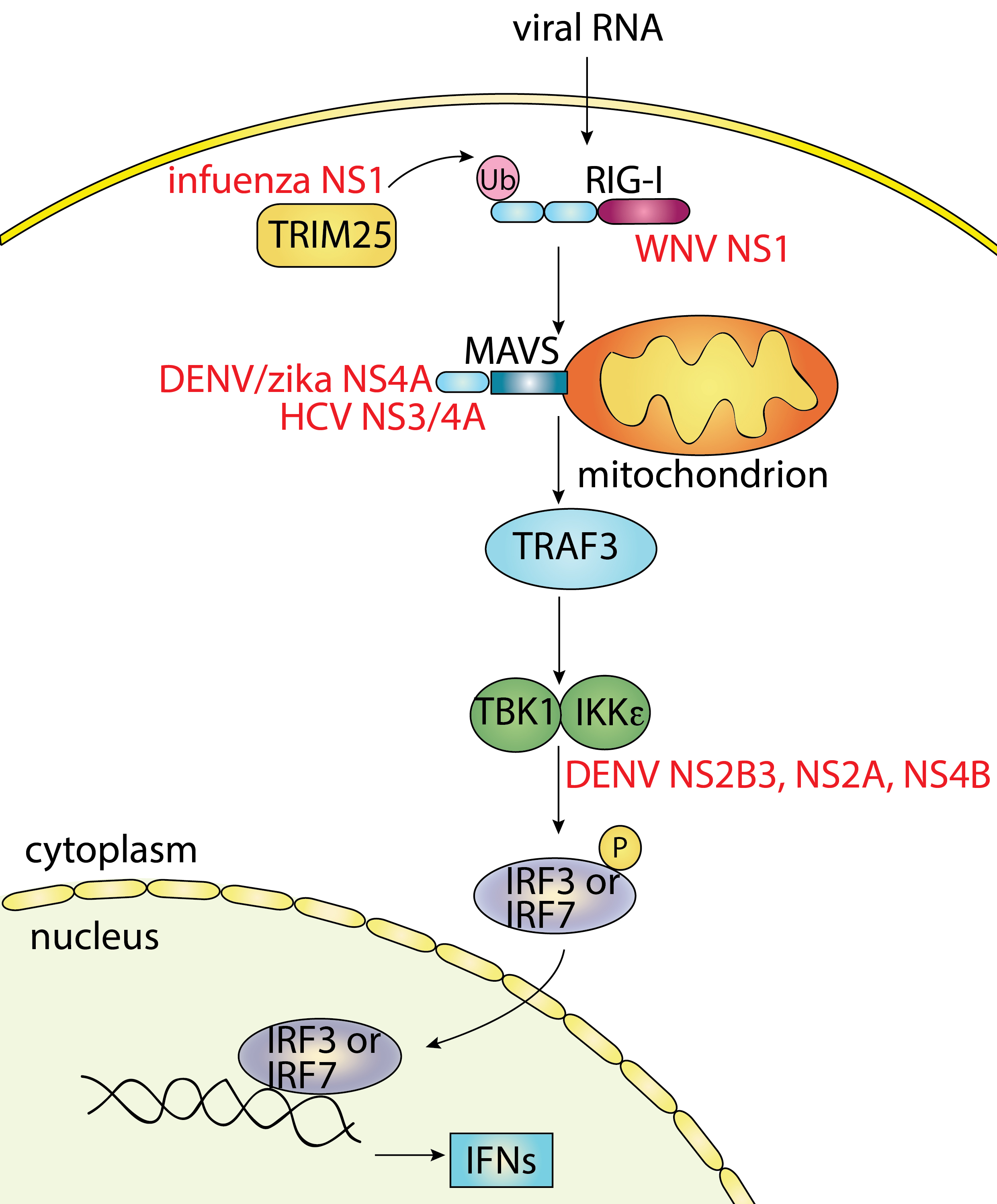
Schematic of RLR signaling. Ub denotes ubiquitination, P denotes phosphorylation.

In the activated state the exposed RIG-I CARD domains interact with the CARD domains of MAVS (mitochondrial antiviral signaling protein, also known as IPS-1, VISA or Cardif) which sits on the outer surface of the mitochondria. This binding event is essential to signaling as it causes MAVS to form large functional aggregates in which TRAF3 (TNF receptor-associated factor 3) and subsequently the IKKε/TBK1 (I-kappa-B kinase-epsilon/TANK-binding kinase 1) complex are recruited. The IKKε/TBK1 complex leads to the activation of the transcription factors interferon regulatory factor 3 (IRF3) and IRF7 which induce type I (including IFNα and IFNβ) and type III interferons (IFN). The type I IFNs bind type I IFN receptors on the surface of the cell that produced them, and also other cell types that express the receptor, to activate JAK-STAT (Janus kinase/signal transducers and activators of transcription) signaling. This leads to the induction of hundreds of interferon stimulated genes (ISGs) that amplify the IFN response. Overall this causes the death of infected cells, the protection of surrounding cells and the activation of the antigen-specific antiviral immune response. Collectively this coordinated antiviral immune response controls the viral infection.

== Regulation ==
As prolonged IFN production is linked to human disease RLR signaling must be tightly regulated. One of various ways that this is achieved is by post-translationally modifying, or tagging, host RLR signaling proteins with phosphate (known as phosphorylation) or ubiquitin (known as ubiquitination). These tags can also be removed, which adds an additional regulatory layer to RLR signaling. These post-translational modifications, and their removal, are prevalent in RLR signaling and even regulate the RIG-I receptor itself. Most famously the RIG-I CARD domain is phosphorylated by protein kinase C-α (PKC-α) and PKC-β in the resting state to negatively regulate signaling. Upon viral infection RIG-I is dephosphorylated by PP1α and PP1γ, permitting the ubiquitination of the RIG-I CARD domain by the E3 ligase TRIM25 to activate the RLR-mediated antiviral immune response. Given post-translational modifications are so pertinent to the activation of RLR signaling, it is not surprising that they are directly, or indirectly, targeted by viruses such as influenza A and measles, respectively, to suppress signaling.

== Viral hijacking of RLR signaling ==
Viruses have evolved ways to subvert RLR signaling to enhance their survival. For example, influenza A virus and West Nile virus (WNV) use their NS1 (nonstructural protein 1) proteins to block RIG-I ubiquitination by TRIM25, or cause RIG-I degradation, respectively, which in turn inhibits IFN production. This outcome is also achieved by the hepatitis C (HCV) NS3/4A protein by cleaving a part of MAVS, and the foot-and-mouth disease virus (FMDV) leader protease (Lpro) which cleaves LGP2. Likewise, dengue virus (DENV) uses its NS2B3, NS2A and NS4B proteins to bind IKKε and prevent IRF3 phosphorylation and its NS4A protein, as per the zika virus, to bind MAVS to block RLR receptor binding. Another prominent example is that of the paramyxovirus V proteins, which directly bind various RLR or downstream signaling proteins including MDA5, LGP2, and STAT, or proteins such as PP1α and PP1γ that negatively regulate RLR signaling.

== See also ==
- NOD-like receptor
- Toll-like receptor
