= Mitochondrial antiviral-signaling protein =

Protein-coding gene in the species Homo sapiens

MAVS

Identifiers
- Aliases: MAVS, CARDIF, IPS-1, IPS1, VISA, mitochondrial antiviral signaling protein
- External IDs: OMIM: 609676; MGI: 2444773; GeneCards: MAVS
Available structures
PDB	Ortholog search: PDBe RCSB
PDB	List of PDB id codes 2MS7, 2MS8, 3J6C, 3J6J, 3RC5, 4P4H, 4Z8M, 5JEK

Gene location (Human)
Chr.	Chromosome 20 (human)
Band	20p13	Start	3,846,799 bp
Band	20p13	End	3,876,123 bp

Gene location (Mouse)
Chr.	Chromosome 2 (mouse)
Band	2|2 F1	Start	131,075,983 bp
Band	2|2 F1	End	131,089,945 bp
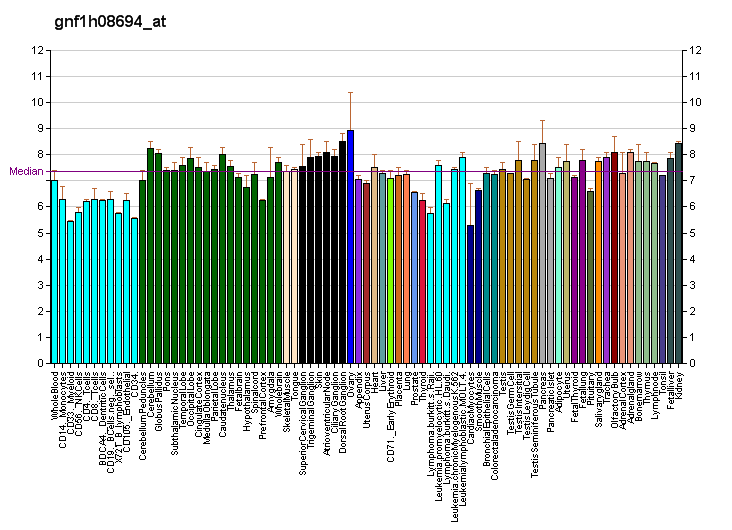

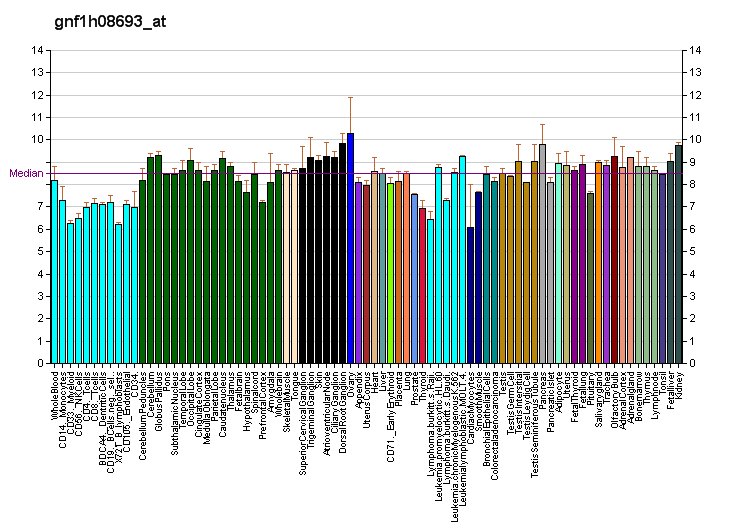
RNA expression pattern
Bgee	Human / Mouse (ortholog); Top expressed in: Skeletal muscle tissue of rectus abdominis; right ventricle; mucosa of colon; lactiferous duct; mucosa of sigmoid colon; Skeletal muscle tissue of biceps brachii; muscle of thigh; gastrocnemius muscle; external globus pallidus; jejunum / Top expressed in: epithelium of small intestine; parotid gland; soleus muscle; myocardium of ventricle; otic vesicle; intercostal muscle; liver; digastric muscle; brown adipose tissue; thoracic diaphragm; More reference expression data
BioGPS	More reference expression data
Gene ontology
Molecular function	signal transducer activity; protein binding; CARD domain binding; protein kinase binding
Cellular component	integral component of membrane; mitochondrial membranes; membrane; peroxisomal membrane; peroxisome; mitochondrial outer membrane; mitochondrion
Biological process	positive regulation of type I interferon-mediated signaling pathway; positive regulation of protein phosphorylation; positive regulation of interferon-alpha production; immune system process; regulation of peroxisome organization; positive regulation of DNA-binding transcription factor activity; positive regulation of IP-10 production; negative regulation of viral genome replication; defense response to bacterium; positive regulation of chemokine (C-C motif) ligand 5 production; positive regulation of interleukin-8 production; cellular response to exogenous dsRNA; activation of innate immune response; positive regulation of tumor necrosis factor production; positive regulation of I-kappaB kinase/NF-kappaB signaling; negative regulation of type I interferon production; innate immune response; viral process; positive regulation of type I interferon production; signal transduction; RIG-I signaling pathway; positive regulation of transcription by RNA polymerase II; positive regulation of defense response to virus by host; positive regulation of interferon-beta production; protein deubiquitination; positive regulation of response to cytokine stimulus; defense response to virus
Sources:Amigo / QuickGO
Orthologs
Databases	NCBI: entry; OMA: entry
Species	Human	Mouse
Entrez	57506	228607
Ensembl	ENSG00000088888	ENSMUSG00000037523
UniProt	Q7Z434	Q8VCF0
RefSeq (mRNA)	NM_001206491; NM_020746; NM_001385663	NM_001206382; NM_001206383; NM_001206385; NM_144888
RefSeq (protein)	NP_001193420; NP_065797	NP_001193311; NP_001193312; NP_001193314; NP_659137
Location (UCSC)	Chr 20: 3.85 – 3.88 Mb	Chr 2: 131.08 – 131.09 Mb
PubMed search
- Wikidata
View/Edit Human	View/Edit Mouse

Mitochondrial antiviral-signaling protein (MAVS) is a protein that is essential for antiviral innate immunity. MAVS is located in the outer membrane of the mitochondria, peroxisomes, and mitochondrial-associated endoplasmic reticulum membrane (MAM). Upon viral infection, a group of cytosolic proteins will detect the presence of the virus and bind to MAVS, thereby activating MAVS. The activation of MAVS leads the virally infected cell to secrete cytokines. This induces an immune response which kills the host's virally infected cells, resulting in clearance of the virus.

== Structure ==
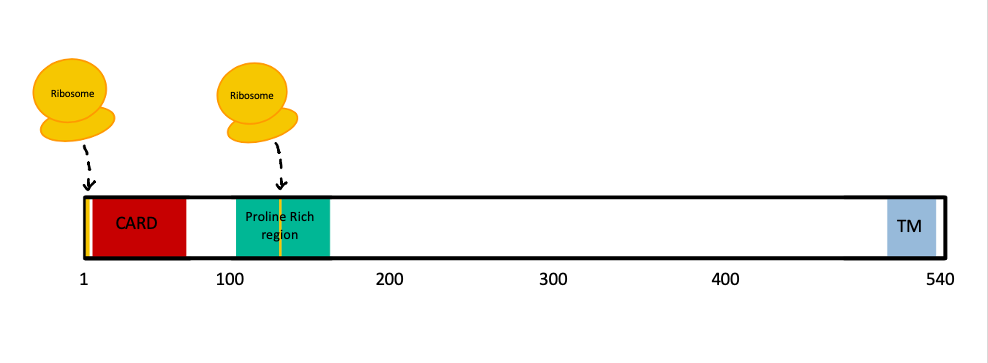
Schematic representation of MAVS gene. Ribosome recognition sites for translation are located at position 1 and position 142 on the MAVS gene, highlighted by the yellow band.

MAVS is also known as IFN-β promoter stimulator I (IPS-1), caspase activation recruitment domain adaptor inducing IFN-β (CARDIF), or virus induced signaling adaptor (VISA). MAVS is encoded by a MAVS gene. MAVS is a 540 amino acid protein that consists of three components, a N-terminal caspase activation recruitment domain (CARD), a proline rich domain, and a transmembrane C terminal domain (TM).

After the MAVS gene has been transcribed into RNA, ribosomes can translate the MAVS protein from two different sites. The initial translation site generates the full-length MAVS protein. The alternative translation site generates a shorter protein, termed as "miniMAVS" or short-MAVS (sMAVS).

sMAVS is a 398 amino acid MAVS protein that lacks the CARD domain. This is significant because the CARD domain is where two cytosolic proteins bind to activate MAVS, signaling that there is a virus present in the cell.

== Function ==
Cellular mechanisms of MAVS pathway

Double stranded RNA viruses are recognized by either the transmembrane toll-like receptor 3 (TLR3) or by one of two cytosolic proteins, retinoic acid-inducible gene I (RIG-I)-like receptors and melanoma differentiation-associated gene 5 (MDA5). RIG-I and MDA5 differ in the viral RNA that they recognize, but they share many structural features, including the N-terminal CARD that allows them to bind to MAVS. MAVS activation leads to the increased levels of pro-inflammatory cytokines via activation of transcription factors, nuclear factor kB (NF-κB), interferon regulatory factor 1 (IRF1), and interferon regulatory factor 3 (IRF3). NF-κB, IRF1, and IRF3 are transcription factors and play critical roles in the production of cytokines.

At a resting state for the cell, a protein called mitofusin 2 (MFN2) is known to interact with MAVS, preventing MAVS from binding to the cytosolic proteins, such as RIG-I and MDA5. Upon recognition of the virus in the cytosol, mitochondria-associated ER membranes (MAM) and mitochondria will become physically tethered by MFN2 and RIG-I binds to a second RIG-I protein to form a protein complex. This complex binds to TRIM25 and molecular chaperone 14-3-3e to form a complex termed "translocon". The translocon travels to the mitochondria where it binds to the CARD region on MAVS, leading to activation of MAVS. Subsequently, MAVS proteins bind to each other through the CARD and TM domain to recruit several downstream signaling factors to form the MAVS signaling complex. The formation of this MAVS signaling complex is aided by augmented levels of mitochondrial reactive oxygen species (mROS), independent of the RNA sensing. The MAVS signaling complex interacts with TANK binding kinase 1 and/or protein kinases IKKA (CHUK) and IKKB (IKBKB), which leads to the phosphorylation and nuclear translocation of IRF3. Although MAVS signal transduction and regulation is not fully understood, activated MAVS proteins in the mitochondria, ER, and peroxisome are needed to maximize the antiviral innate immune response.

MAVS protein induces apoptosis in host virally infected cells by interacting with a protease called caspase 8. Activation of apoptosis by caspase 8 is independent of the Bax/Bak apoptotic pathway, the main pathway of apoptosis in cells.

== Viral evasion ==
Certain viruses, such as human cytomegalovirus (HCMV) and hepatitis C (HCV), have adapted to suppress the function of MAVS in the antiviral innate immune response, aiding in viral replication. HCMV impairs MAVS through the viral mitochondria-localized inhibitor of apoptosis protein (vMIA), thus reducing the pro-inflammatory cytokine response. vMIA also localizes to the peroxisome where it interacts with cytoplasmic chaperone protein Pex19, disabling the transport machinery of peroxisomal membrane proteins. The HCV NS3-NS4A strain inactivates MAVS signaling by cleaving the MAVS protein directly upstream of MAVS membrane-targeting domain in the MAM and peroxisome, preventing MAVS downstream signaling.

== Regulation ==
The expression and function of MAVS are regulated at the transcriptional, posttranscriptional, and posttranslational level.

- At the transcriptional level, the reactive oxygen species (ROS) generated during antiviral response acts as a negative regulator. MAVS, additionally, encodes a number of splice variants that have been proposed to regulate MAVS.
- At the post-transcriptional level, there are two translational sites present on MAVS that can generate two proteins of MAVS. The alternative translation site resides upstream, resulting in expression of sMAVS.
- At the translational level, proteins such as a family of ubiquitin E3 ligase regulate MAVS activity.
