= Edward B. Singleton =

Edward Bivens Singleton (October 22, 1920 – January 10, 2015) was an American physician and one of the early pediatric radiologists in the United States. He was the first physician hired by Texas Children's Hospital before it opened in the 1950s, and he practiced there until shortly before his death. He received awards for his career achievements from several radiology-related organizations.

== Biography ==
Singleton was born in Galveston, Texas, where his father Albert was a well-regarded surgeon. When he was 16 years old, Singleton entered the University of Texas at Austin. At Texas, he became fraternity brothers and lifelong friends with future cardiovascular surgeon Denton Cooley. As a student, Singleton was diagnosed with tuberculosis and was prescribed bedrest. Though he originally wanted to be a surgeon, he began to consider radiology as a career that was less physically demanding. After graduating from the University of Texas Medical Branch (UTMB), he completed a radiology residency at the University of Michigan. At Michigan, he met pediatric radiology pioneer John F. Holt and became interested in this subspecialty.

After his residency, Singleton accepted a position as the first radiology chief at St. Luke's Episcopal Hospital and Texas Children's Hospital, two new Houston hospitals that were initially operated as one institution. He was the first physician to join the payroll at Texas Children's. He founded Singleton Associates, a group of radiologists that provides services to Texas Children's and CHI St. Luke's Medical Center, in 1954. Singleton served in the military between 1955 and 1957 before returning to his practice in Houston. He served as secretary of the board of trustees for the Texas Heart Institute when the center was created in the early 1960s.

The American Roentgen Ray Society awarded Singleton the ARRS Gold Medal in 1983, the first year that it was awarded. He received the 1992 Gold Medal from the Society for Pediatric Radiology, and he was a past president of that organization. The society issues the Singleton-Taybi Award to honor excellence in education. In 1994, he was presented with the Gold Medal Award from the American College of Radiology. In 2007, Singleton and Cooley were honored as two of the first five Legends in Medicine at UTMB. A rare genetic disorder, Singleton Merten syndrome, is named in part after him.

Singleton required bypass surgery in his seventies, and he chose Cooley to perform the procedure. Though he retired as the department chief at Texas Children's in the mid-1990s, Singleton returned within two months to a full-time staff radiologist position at the hospital, and he practiced until shortly before his death. Singleton died after a short illness on January 10, 2015.
