= MDA5 =

Mammalian protein found in Homo sapiens

IFIH1
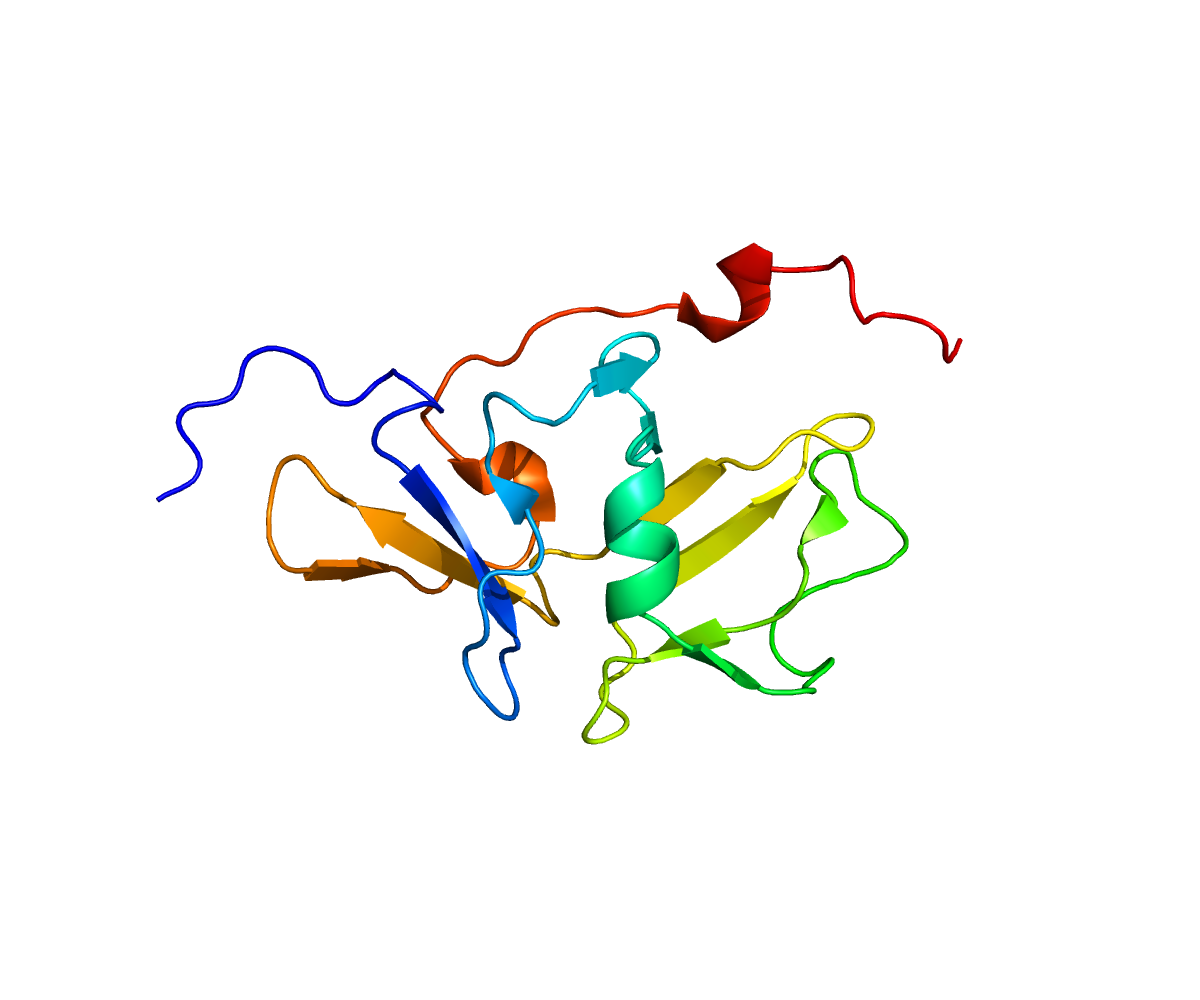

Identifiers
- Aliases: IFIH1, AGS7, Hlcd, IDDM19, MDA-5, MDA5, RLR-2, SGMRT1, interferon induced with helicase C domain 1, IMD95
- External IDs: OMIM: 606951; MGI: 1918836; GeneCards: IFIH1
Available structures
| PDB | Ortholog search: PDBe RCSB |
| PDB | List of PDB id codes 2RQB, 3B6E, 3GA3, 4GL2 |
Enzyme activity
| EC # | BRENDA | ExPASy | KEGG | MetaCyc |
|---|---|---|---|---|
| 3.6.4.13 | ↗ | ↗ | ↗ | ↗ |

Gene location (Human)
| Chr. | Chromosome 2 (human) |
| Band | 2q24.2 | Start | 162,267,074 bp |
| Band | 2q24.2 | End | 162,318,684 bp |

Gene location (Mouse)
| Chr. | Chromosome 2 (mouse) |
| Band | 2|2 C1.3 | Start | 62,426,142 bp |
| Band | 2|2 C1.3 | End | 62,476,599 bp |
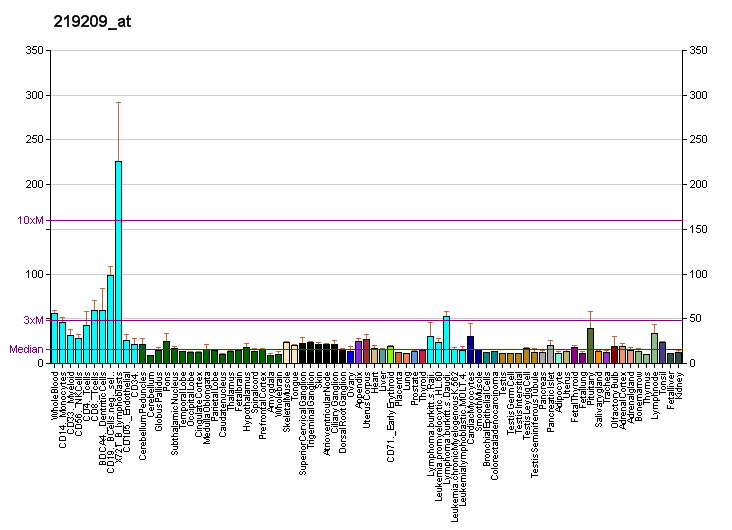
RNA expression pattern
| Bgee | Human / Mouse (ortholog); Top expressed in: palpebral conjunctiva; parotid gland; jejunal mucosa; monocyte; epithelium of nasopharynx; sperm; parietal pleura; visceral pleura; appendix; germinal epithelium / Top expressed in: mucous cell of stomach; conjunctival fornix; jejunum; intestinal epithelium; left colon; left lobe of liver; Paneth cell; intestinal villus; vestibular membrane of cochlear duct; epithelium of small intestine; More reference expression data |
| BioGPS | More reference expression data |
Gene ontology
| Molecular function | DNA binding; nucleotide binding; helicase activity; zinc ion binding; metal ion binding; protein binding; single-stranded RNA binding; RNA binding; double-stranded RNA binding; ribonucleoprotein complex binding; hydrolase activity; ATP binding; identical protein binding |
| Cellular component | cytoplasm; cytosol; nucleus |
| Biological process | positive regulation of interferon-alpha production; MDA-5 signaling pathway; immune system process; response to virus; protein sumoylation; cytoplasmic pattern recognition receptor signaling pathway in response to virus; negative regulation of type I interferon production; detection of virus; viral process; innate immune response; regulation of type III interferon production; positive regulation of interferon-beta production; protein deubiquitination; positive regulation of response to cytokine stimulus; cellular response to exogenous dsRNA; defense response to virus |
Sources:Amigo / QuickGO
Orthologs
| Databases | NCBI: entry; OMA: entry |
| Species | Human | Mouse |
| Entrez | 64135 | 71586 |
| Ensembl | ENSG00000115267 | ENSMUSG00000026896 |
| UniProt | Q9BYX4 | Q8R5F7 |
| RefSeq (mRNA) | NM_022168 | NM_001164477; NM_027835 |
| RefSeq (protein) | NP_071451 | NP_001157949; NP_082111 |
| Location (UCSC) | Chr 2: 162.27 – 162.32 Mb | Chr 2: 62.43 – 62.48 Mb |
| PubMed search |
- Wikidata
| View/Edit Human | View/Edit Mouse |

MDA5 (melanoma differentiation-associated protein 5) is a RIG-I-like receptor dsRNA helicase enzyme that is encoded by the IFIH1 gene in humans. MDA5 is part of the RIG-I-like receptor (RLR) family, which also includes RIG-I and LGP2, and functions as a pattern recognition receptor capable of detecting viruses. It is generally believed that MDA5 recognizes double stranded RNA (dsRNA) over 2000nts in length, however it has been shown that whilst MDA5 can detect and bind to cytoplasmic dsRNA, it is also activated by a high molecular weight RNA complex composed of ssRNA and dsRNA. For many viruses, effective MDA5-mediated antiviral responses are dependent on functionally active LGP2. The signaling cascades in MDA5 are initiated via CARD domains. Some observations made in cancer cells show that MDA5 also interacts with cellular RNA and is able to induce an autoinflammatory response.

== Function ==
=== As a pattern recognition receptor ===
MDA5 is able to detect long dsRNA, the genomic RNA of dsRNA viruses as well as replicative intermediates of both positive and negative sense RNA viruses. MDA5 has also been shown to interact with a number of chemical modifications of RNA. The eukaryotic messenger RNA, for example, is often methylated at the 2′-O position of the first and second nucleotide behind the 5′ cap. These structures are termed cap1 and cap2 respectively. MDA5 is able to detect the absence of the 2′-O-methylation, bind to this type of RNA and initiate an immune response.

==== Mechanism ====
Activated MDA5 interacts with the mitochondrial antiviral signaling proteins (MAVS) through its caspase activation and recruitment domains (CARDs) at the N-terminus. The MAVS then work as a multiprotein complex to recruit the inhibitor of nuclear factor kappa-B kinase subunit epsilon (IKKε) along with the serine/threonine-protein kinase 1 (TBK1). This causes the phosphorylation and the transport of the interferon regulatory factors 3 and 7 (IRF3 and IRF7) into the cell's nucleus. Once there, the regulatory factors induce the transcription of type I interferon genes IFN-β and IFN-α.

== Structure ==
MDA5 is classified as an ATP-dependent DExD/H box RNA helicase. It comprises two CARD domains located at the N-terminus, a hinge region and the helicase domain which is made up of the domains RecA-like Hel1 and Hel2. Another hinge region connects the C-terminal domain (CTD) which is responsible for the recognition and the binding of RNA. Apart from the positively charged groove recognizing the RNA, the CTD also contains a zinc binding domain.

DEAD box proteins, characterized by the conserved motif Asp-Glu-Ala-Asp (DEAD), are putative RNA helicases. They are implicated in a number of cellular processes involving alteration of RNA secondary structure such as translation initiation, nuclear and mitochondrial splicing, and ribosome and spliceosome assembly. Based on their distribution patterns, some members of this family are believed to be involved in embryogenesis, spermatogenesis, and cellular growth and division. This gene encodes a DEAD box protein that is upregulated in response to treatment with beta-interferon (IFN-β) and a protein kinase C-activating compound, mezerein (MEZ). Irreversible reprogramming of melanomas can be achieved by treatment with both these agents; treatment with either agent alone only achieves reversible differentiation.

== Clinical significance ==
Mutations in IFIH1/MDA5 are associated to Singleton-Merten Syndrome and to Aicardi–Goutières syndrome.

Some IFIH1 SNPs are associated with increased risk of type 1 diabetes.

Antibodies against MDA5 are associated to amyopathic dermatomyositis with rapidly progressive interstitial lung disease.
