= LGP2 =

Protein-coding gene in the species Homo sapiens

DHX58
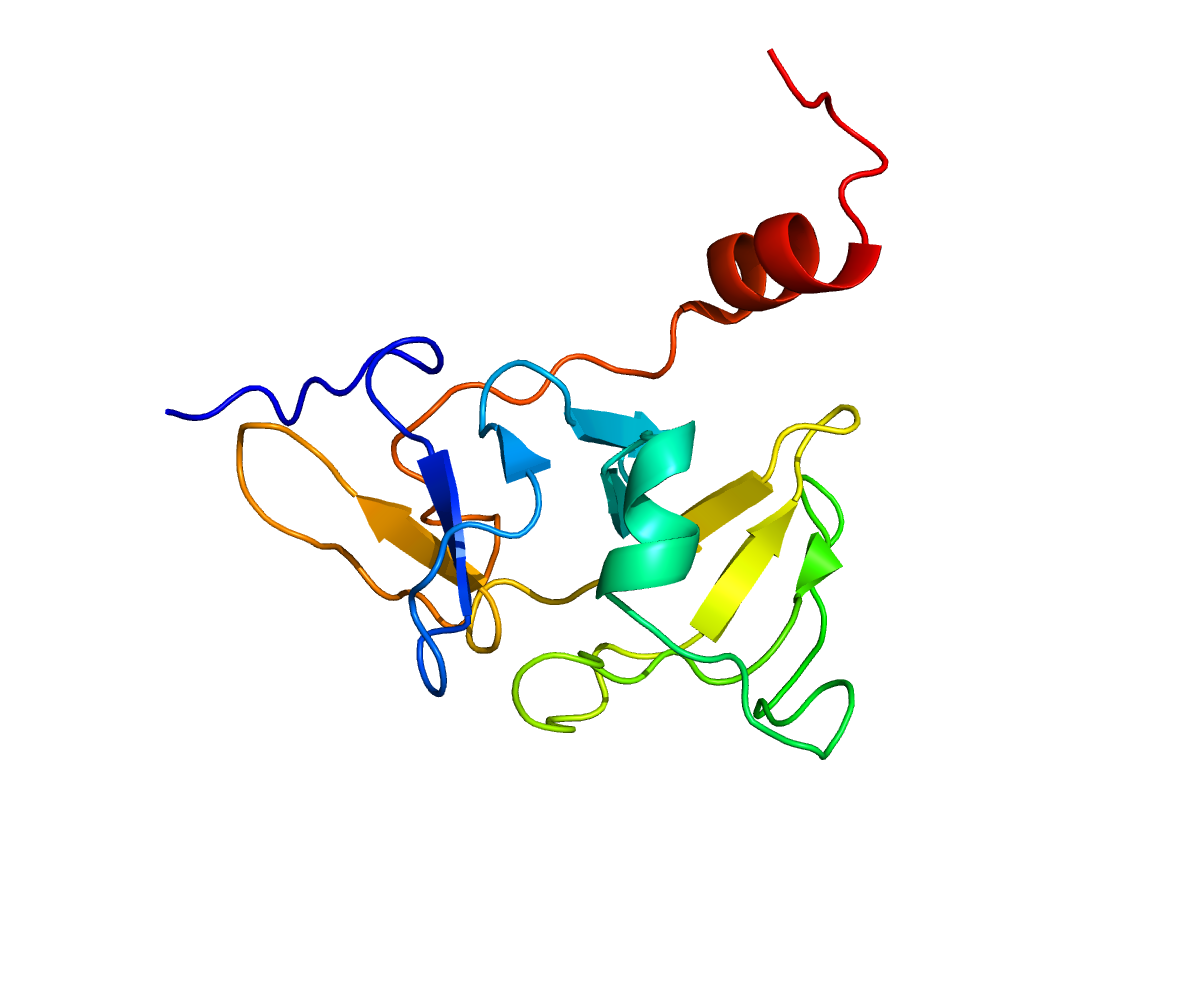

Identifiers
- Aliases: DHX58, D11LGP2, D11lgp2e, LGP2, RLR-3, DEXH-box helicase 58
- External IDs: OMIM: 608588; MGI: 1931560; GeneCards: DHX58
Available structures
PDB	Ortholog search: PDBe RCSB
PDB	List of PDB id codes 2RQA, 2W4R, 3EQT
Enzyme activity
EC #	BRENDA	ExPASy	KEGG	MetaCyc
3.6.4.13	↗	↗	↗	↗

Gene location (Human)
Chr.	Chromosome 17 (human)
Band	17q21.2	Start	42,101,404 bp
Band	17q21.2	End	42,112,714 bp

Gene location (Mouse)
Chr.	Chromosome 11 (mouse)
Band	11 D|11 63.52 cM	Start	100,585,710 bp
Band	11 D|11 63.52 cM	End	100,595,097 bp
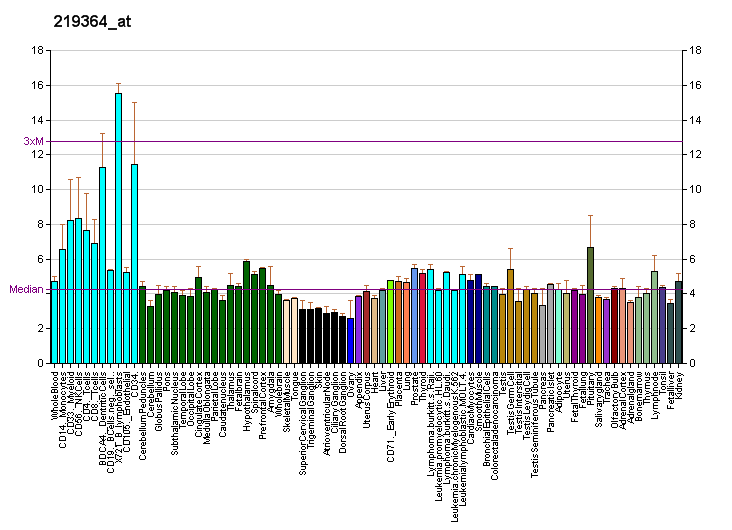
RNA expression pattern
Bgee	Human / Mouse (ortholog); Top expressed in: granulocyte; right lobe of liver; right uterine tube; right adrenal gland; right adrenal cortex; left adrenal cortex; apex of heart; monocyte; left ovary; tibial nerve / Top expressed in: granulocyte; spermatocyte; spermatid; seminiferous tubule; adrenal gland; mucous cell of stomach; lumbar spinal ganglion; stroma of bone marrow; embryo; embryo; More reference expression data
BioGPS	More reference expression data
Gene ontology
Molecular function	DNA binding; nucleotide binding; helicase activity; zinc ion binding; metal ion binding; protein binding; single-stranded RNA binding; RNA binding; double-stranded RNA binding; hydrolase activity; ATP binding
Cellular component	cytoplasm
Biological process	negative regulation of MDA-5 signaling pathway; regulation of innate immune response; immune system process; response to virus; positive regulation of RIG-I signaling pathway; defense response to virus; negative regulation of innate immune response; negative regulation of type I interferon production; innate immune response; viral process; positive regulation of MDA-5 signaling pathway; positive regulation of type I interferon production; negative regulation of RIG-I signaling pathway; response to bacterium
Sources:Amigo / QuickGO
Orthologs
Databases	NCBI: entry; OMA: entry
Species	Human	Mouse
Entrez	79132	80861
Ensembl	ENSG00000108771	ENSMUSG00000017830
UniProt	Q96C10	Q99J87
RefSeq (mRNA)	NM_024119	NM_030150
RefSeq (protein)	NP_077024	NP_084426
Location (UCSC)	Chr 17: 42.1 – 42.11 Mb	Chr 11: 100.59 – 100.6 Mb
PubMed search
- Wikidata
View/Edit Human	View/Edit Mouse

Probable ATP-dependent RNA helicase DHX58 also known as RIG-I-like receptor 3 (RLR-3) or RIG-I-like receptor LGP2 (RLR) is a RIG-I-like receptor dsRNA helicase enzyme that in humans is encoded by the DHX58 gene. The protein encoded by the gene DHX58 is known as LGP2 (Laboratory of Genetics and Physiology 2).

== Structure and function ==
LGP2 was first identified and characterized in the context of mammary tissue in 2001, but its function has been found to be more relevant to the field of innate antiviral immunity. LGP2 has been found to be essential for producing effective antiviral responses against many viruses that are recognized by RIG-I and MDA5.

Since LGP2 lacks CARD domains, its effect on downstream antiviral signaling is likely due to interaction with dsRNA viral ligand or the other RLRs (RIG-I and MDA5).

LGP2 has been shown to directly interact with RIG-I through its C-terminal repressor domain (RD). The primary contact sites in this interaction is likely between the RD of LGP2 and the CARD or helicase domain of RIG-I as it is seen with RIG-I self-association, but this has not been confirmed. The helicase activity of LGP2 has been found to be essential for its positive regulation of RIG-I signaling. Overexpression of LGP2 is able to inhibit RIG-I-mediated antiviral signaling both in the presence and absence of viral ligands. This inhibition of RIG-I signaling is not dependent upon the ability of LGP2 to bind viral ligands and is therefore not due to ligand competition. Although LGP2 binds to dsRNA with higher affinity, it is dispensable for RIG-I-mediated recognition of synthetic dsRNA ligands. RIG-I, when overexpressed and in LGP2 knock-down studies, has been shown to induce antiviral response in the absence of viral ligand.
