= EFCAB6 =

Protein-coding gene in the species Homo sapiens

Identifiers
- Aliases: EFCAB6, DJBP, HSCBCIP1, dJ185D5.1, EF-hand calcium binding domain 6
- External IDs: MGI: 1924877; GeneCards: EFCAB6
Available structures
PDB	Ortholog search: PDBe RCSB
PDB	List of PDB id codes 1WLZ, 5D67

Gene location (Human)
Chr.	Chromosome 22 (human)
Band	22q13.2-q13.31	Start	43,528,744 bp
Band	22q13.2-q13.31	End	43,812,337 bp

Gene location (Mouse)
Chr.	Chromosome 15 (mouse)
Band	15|15 E1- E2	Start	83,750,913 bp
Band	15|15 E1- E2	End	83,949,580 bp
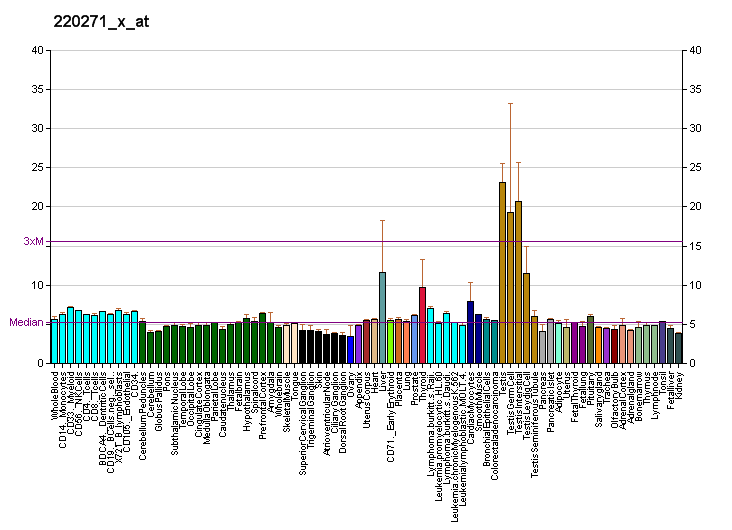
RNA expression pattern
Bgee	Human / Mouse (ortholog); Top expressed in: left testis; right testis; sperm; buccal mucosa cell; right uterine tube; bronchial epithelial cell; oocyte; testicle; olfactory zone of nasal mucosa; gonad / Top expressed in: spermatid; seminiferous tubule; spermatocyte; zygote; primary oocyte; secondary oocyte; muscle of thigh; temporal muscle; cornea; skeletal muscle tissue; More reference expression data
BioGPS	More reference expression data
Gene ontology
Molecular function	metal ion binding; calcium ion binding
Cellular component	nucleus; nucleoplasm
Biological process	regulation of transcription, DNA-templated; transcription, DNA-templated
Sources:Amigo / QuickGO
Orthologs
Databases	NCBI: entry; OMA: entry
Species	Human	Mouse
Entrez	64800	77627
Ensembl	ENSG00000186976	ENSMUSG00000022441
UniProt	Q5THR3	Q6P1E8
RefSeq (mRNA)	NM_022785; NM_198856	NM_001161628; NM_001161629; NM_029946
RefSeq (protein)	NP_073622; NP_942153	NP_001155100; NP_001155101; NP_084222
Location (UCSC)	Chr 22: 43.53 – 43.81 Mb	Chr 15: 83.75 – 83.95 Mb
PubMed search
- Wikidata
View/Edit Human	View/Edit Mouse

EF-hand calcium-binding domain-containing protein 6 is a protein that in humans is encoded by the EFCAB6 gene.

== Interactions ==
EFCAB6 has been shown to interact with PARK7 and Androgen receptor.
