= DJ-1 =

Protein-coding gene found in humans

PARK7
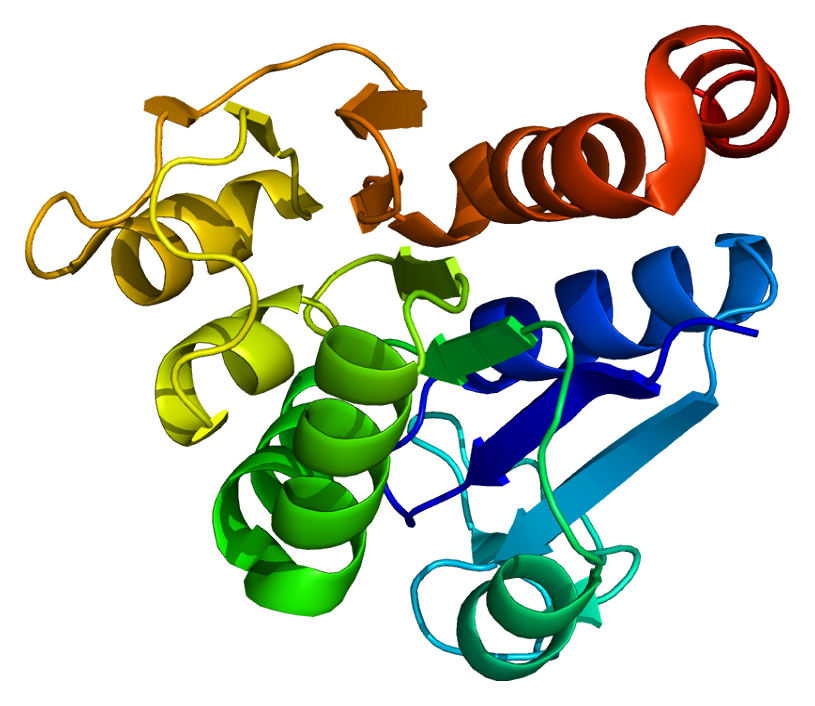

Identifiers
- Aliases: PARK7, DJ-1, DJ1, HEL-S-67p, Parkinsonism associated deglycase, GATD2
- External IDs: OMIM: 602533; MGI: 2135637; GeneCards: PARK7
Available structures
PDB	Ortholog search: PDBe RCSB
PDB	List of PDB id codes 1J42, 1P5F, 1PDV, 1PDW, 1PE0, 1Q2U, 1SOA, 1UCF, 2OR3, 2R1T, 2R1U, 2R1V, 2RK3, 2RK4, 2RK6, 3B36, 3B38, 3B3A, 3BWE, 3CY6, 3CYF, 3CZ9, 3CZA, 3EZG, 3F71, 3SF8, 4BTE, 4MNT, 4MTC, 4N0M, 4N12, 4OGF, 4OQ4, 4P2G, 4P34, 4P35, 4P36, 4ZGG, 4RKW, 4RKY, 4S0Z
Enzyme activity
EC #	BRENDA	ExPASy	KEGG	MetaCyc
3.5.1.124	↗	↗	↗	↗

Gene location (Human)
Chr.	Chromosome 1 (human)
Band	1p36.23	Start	7,954,291 bp
Band	1p36.23	End	7,985,505 bp

Gene location (Mouse)
Chr.	Chromosome 4 (mouse)
Band	4|4 E2	Start	150,981,590 bp
Band	4|4 E2	End	150,998,894 bp
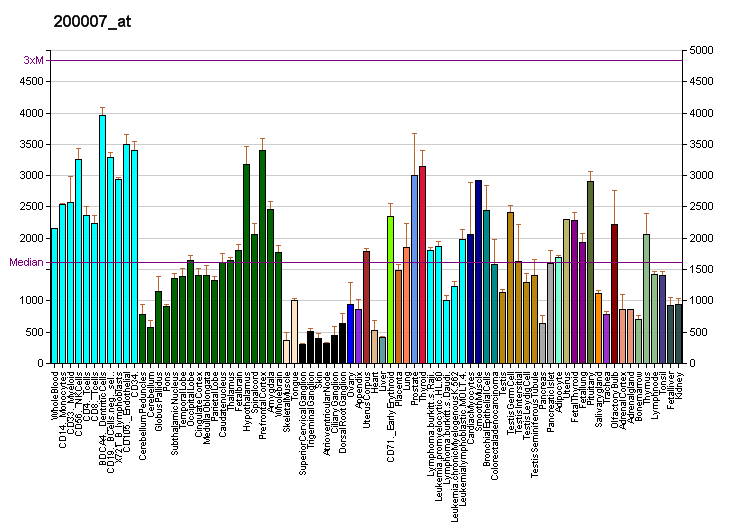
RNA expression pattern
Bgee	Human / Mouse (ortholog); Top expressed in: tibia; deltoid muscle; endothelial cell; Epithelium of choroid plexus; dorsal motor nucleus of vagus nerve; tibialis anterior muscle; Skeletal muscle tissue of biceps brachii; islet of Langerhans; vastus lateralis muscle; right ventricle / Top expressed in: triceps brachii muscle; vastus lateralis muscle; gastrocnemius muscle; medial head of gastrocnemius muscle; facial motor nucleus; tibialis anterior muscle; retinal pigment epithelium; Paneth cell; temporal muscle; extensor digitorum longus muscle; More reference expression data
BioGPS	More reference expression data
Gene ontology
Molecular function	signaling receptor binding; cytokine binding; cupric ion binding; transcription factor binding; L-dopa decarboxylase activator activity; peptidase activity; kinase binding; tyrosine 3-monooxygenase activator activity; enzyme binding; mRNA binding; protein homodimerization activity; scaffold protein binding; small protein activating enzyme binding; single-stranded DNA binding; ubiquitin-like protein conjugating enzyme binding; protein binding; peroxiredoxin activity; double-stranded DNA binding; copper ion binding; mercury ion binding; transcription coactivator activity; oxidoreductase activity, acting on peroxide as acceptor; androgen receptor binding; superoxide dismutase copper chaperone activity; RNA binding; identical protein binding; ubiquitin-specific protease binding; hydrolase activity; cuprous ion binding; cadherin binding; protein deglycase activity; protein-containing complex binding
Cellular component	cytoplasm; cytosol; membrane; mitochondrial intermembrane space; mitochondrion; neuron projection; nucleus; mitochondrial respiratory chain complex I; endoplasmic reticulum; membrane raft; chromatin; extracellular exosome; plasma membrane; mitochondrial matrix; cell body; PML body; presynapse; perinuclear region of cytoplasm; axon; nucleoplasm
Biological process	negative regulation of neuron apoptotic process; positive regulation of transcription regulatory region DNA binding; negative regulation of protein sumoylation; negative regulation of cysteine-type endopeptidase activity involved in apoptotic signaling pathway; negative regulation of protein binding; synaptic transmission, dopaminergic; positive regulation of interleukin-8 production; negative regulation of proteasomal ubiquitin-dependent protein catabolic process; Ras protein signal transduction; cellular response to glyoxal; negative regulation of protein acetylation; positive regulation of reactive oxygen species biosynthetic process; positive regulation of oxidative phosphorylation uncoupler activity; positive regulation of protein kinase B signaling; negative regulation of protein catabolic process; adult locomotory behavior; regulation of neuron apoptotic process; negative regulation of extrinsic apoptotic signaling pathway; negative regulation of cell death; glycolate biosynthetic process; positive regulation of protein homodimerization activity; negative regulation of gene expression; single fertilization; positive regulation of peptidyl-serine phosphorylation; positive regulation of mitochondrial electron transport, NADH to ubiquinone; negative regulation of hydrogen peroxide-induced neuron intrinsic apoptotic signaling pathway; negative regulation of oxidative stress-induced cell death; inflammatory response; negative regulation of oxidative stress-induced neuron intrinsic apoptotic signaling pathway; regulation of supramolecular fiber organization; negative regulation of neuron death; negative regulation of protein phosphorylation; negative regulation of endoplasmic reticulum stress-induced intrinsic apoptotic signaling pathway; negative regulation of protein kinase activity; negative regulation of oxidative stress-induced neuron death; membrane depolarization; protein stabilization; mitochondrion organization; positive regulation of DNA-binding transcription factor activity; negative regulation of death-inducing signaling complex assembly; negative regulation of apoptotic process; proteolysis; negative regulation of protein K48-linked deubiquitination; dopamine uptake involved in synaptic transmission; positive regulation of tyrosine 3-monooxygenase activity; positive regulation of L-dopa decarboxylase activity; negative regulation of hydrogen peroxide-induced neuron death; regulation of inflammatory response; regulation of androgen receptor signaling pathway; negative regulation of hydrogen peroxide-induced cell death; positive regulation of autophagy of mitochondrion; response to hydrogen peroxide; detoxification of copper ion; positive regulation of superoxide dismutase activity; positive regulation of dopamine biosynthetic process; positive regulation of protein localization to nucleus; positive regulation of L-dopa biosynthetic process; activation of protein kinase B activity; membrane hyperpolarization; detoxification of mercury ion; negative regulation of TRAIL-activated apoptotic signaling pathway; cellular oxidant detoxification; negative regulation of ubiquitin-specific protease activity; autophagy; cellular response to reactive oxygen species; regulation of mitochondrial membrane potential; negative regulation of protein ubiquitination; hydrogen peroxide metabolic process; positive regulation of gene expression; negative regulation of protein export from nucleus; negative regulation of ubiquitin-protein transferase activity; positive regulation of oxidative stress-induced intrinsic apoptotic signaling pathway; cellular response to oxidative stress; positive regulation of androgen receptor activity; positive regulation of pyrroline-5-carboxylate reductase activity; positive regulation of transcription by RNA polymerase II; cellular response to hydrogen peroxide; methylglyoxal metabolic process; lactate biosynthetic process; peptidyl-cysteine deglycation; peptidyl-arginine deglycation; peptidyl-lysine deglycation; protein deglycation, glyoxal removal; protein deglycation, methylglyoxal removal; glutathione deglycation; glyoxal metabolic process; negative regulation of nitrosative stress-induced intrinsic apoptotic signaling pathway; positive regulation of acute inflammatory response to antigenic stimulus; protein deglycosylation; positive regulation of NAD(P)H oxidase activity; DNA repair; cellular response to DNA damage stimulus; insulin secretion; glucose homeostasis; guanine deglycation; guanine deglycation, methylglyoxal removal; guanine deglycation, glyoxal removal; negative regulation of reactive oxygen species biosynthetic process
Sources:Amigo / QuickGO
Orthologs
Databases	NCBI: entry; OMA: entry
Species	Human	Mouse
Entrez	11315	57320
Ensembl	ENSG00000116288	ENSMUSG00000028964
UniProt	Q99497	Q99LX0
RefSeq (mRNA)	NM_001123377; NM_007262	NM_020569
RefSeq (protein)	NP_001116849; NP_009193	NP_065594
Location (UCSC)	Chr 1: 7.95 – 7.99 Mb	Chr 4: 150.98 – 151 Mb
PubMed search
- Wikidata
View/Edit Human	View/Edit Mouse

DJ1, also known as Parkinson disease protein 7, is a protein which in humans is encoded by the PARK7 gene. Its weak glyoxalase activity has been verified by many labs, however the reported protein deglycase activity is likely to be an artifact stemming from DJ-1's ability to destroy free methylglyoxal.

== Structure ==
=== Gene ===
The gene PARK7, also known as DJ-1, encodes a protein of the peptidase C56 family. The human gene PARK7 has 8 exons and locates at chromosome band 1p36.23.

=== Protein ===
The human protein DJ-1 is 20 kDa in size and composed of 189 amino acids with seven β-strands and nine α-helices in total and is present as a dimer. It belongs to the peptidase C56 family of proteins.

The protein structures of human protein DJ-1, Escherichia coli chaperone Hsp31, YhbO, and YajL and an Archaea protease are evolutionarily conserved.

== Function ==
DJ-1 was shown to prevent metabolite and protein damage caused by a glycolytic metabolite. This metabolite has been suggested and confirmed to be cyclic 3-phosphoglycerate (or cyclic 3-phosphoglyceric anhydride). Catalytic efficiency of DJ-1 as a hydrolase of cyclic 3-phosphoglyceric anhydride is 10,000 times higher than other reported enzymatic activities of DJ-1.

Under an oxidative condition, DJ-1 inhibits the aggregation of α-synuclein via its chaperone activity, thus functioning as a redox-sensitive chaperone and as a sensor for oxidative stress. Accordingly, DJ-1 apparently protects neurons against oxidative stress and cell death. In parallel, protein DJ-1 acts as a positive regulator of androgen receptor-dependent transcription. DJ-1 is expressed in both the neural retina and retinal pigment epithelium of mammals, where it exerts a neuroprotective role against oxidative stress under both physiological and pathological conditions.

Pyrroloquinoline quinone (PQQ) has been shown to reduce the self-oxidation of the DJ-1 protein, an early step in the onset of some forms of Parkinson's disease.

Functional DJ-1 protein has been shown to bind metals and protect against metal-induced cytotoxicity from copper and mercury.

DJ-1/PARK7 and its bacterial homologs: Hsp31, YhbO, and YajL can repair methylglyoxal and glyoxal glycated nucleotides. Guanine, either in the form of a free nucleotide or as a nucleotide incorporated into nucleic acid (DNA or RNA), if glycated, can be repaired by DJ-1/PARK7. Deglycase-deficient bacterial mutants with reduced ability to repair glycated bases in DNA show strong mutator phenotypes. A follow up study confirmed that DJ-1 reduces levels of reversible adducts of methylglyoxal with guanine and cysteine in vitro. However, since the steady-state kinetics of DJ-1 acting on reversible hemithioacetal substrates are fitted adequately with a computational kinetic model that requires only a DJ-1 glyoxalase activity, it was concluded that deglycation is an apparent rather than a true activity of DJ-1.

=== DNA repair ===
DJ-1 is a DNA damage response protein that is recruited to sites of DNA damage where it participates in the repair of DNA double-strand breaks through the processes of non-homologous end joining and homologous recombination. Evidence for a linkage between DNA damage and Parkinson's disease has been reported for decades. Recently evidence has been presented that defective DNA repair is linked specifically to DJ-1 mutation, and thus DJ-1 mutation likely contributes to Parkinson's disease pathogenesis.

== Clinical significance ==
Defects in this gene are the cause of autosomal recessive early-onset Parkinson's disease 7.

== Interactions ==
PARK7 has been shown to interact with:

- CASK,
- EFCAB6, and
- PIAS2.

== See also ==
- Animal models of Parkinson's disease
- Mitochondria associated membranes
- Stress granule
