= TRIM25 =

Protein-coding gene in the species Homo sapiens

Identifiers
- Aliases: TRIM25, EFP, RNF147, Z147, ZNF147, tripartite motif containing 25
- External IDs: OMIM: 600453; MGI: 102749; GeneCards: TRIM25
Available structures
PDB	Ortholog search: PDBe RCSB
PDB	List of PDB id codes 4CFG, 4LTB, 5FER
Enzyme activity
EC #	BRENDA	ExPASy	KEGG	MetaCyc
2.3.2.27	↗	↗	↗	↗

Gene location (Human)
Chr.	Chromosome 17 (human)
Band	17q22	Start	56,836,387 bp
Band	17q22	End	56,914,080 bp

Gene location (Mouse)
Chr.	Chromosome 11 (mouse)
Band	11|11 C	Start	88,890,202 bp
Band	11|11 C	End	88,911,119 bp
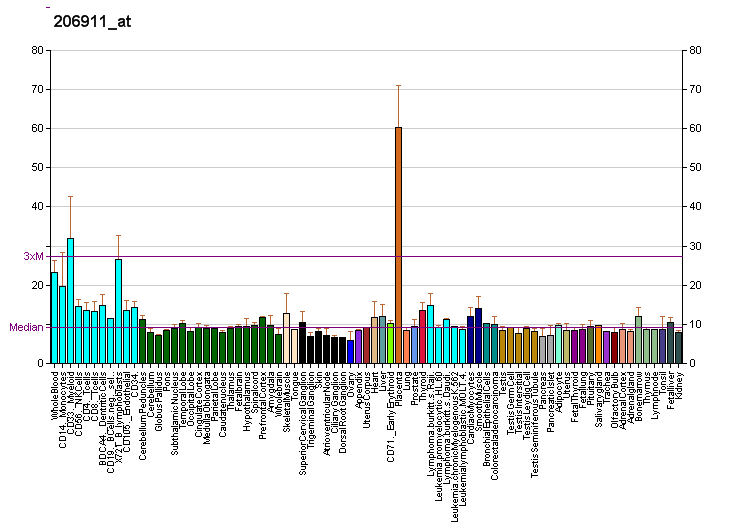
RNA expression pattern
Bgee	Human / Mouse (ortholog); Top expressed in: mucosa of ileum; blood; pancreatic epithelial cell; lower lobe of lung; jejunal mucosa; monocyte; appendix; thymus; skin of hip; spleen / Top expressed in: Paneth cell; medullary collecting duct; renal corpuscle; semi-lunar valve; conjunctival fornix; retinal pigment epithelium; ciliary body; endothelial cell of lymphatic vessel; ureter; epithelium of stomach; More reference expression data
BioGPS	More reference expression data
Gene ontology
Molecular function	transferase activity; DNA-binding transcription factor activity; ubiquitin protein ligase activity; metal ion binding; ligase activity; protein binding; ubiquitin-protein transferase activity; RNA binding; cadherin binding; zinc ion binding
Cellular component	nucleoplasm; cytoplasm; cytosol; nuclear body; intracellular anatomical structure
Biological process	ERAD pathway; negative regulation of viral entry into host cell; immune system process; interferon-gamma-mediated signaling pathway; positive regulation of DNA-binding transcription factor activity; protein monoubiquitination; defense response to virus; positive regulation of NF-kappaB transcription factor activity; protein ubiquitination; positive regulation of I-kappaB kinase/NF-kappaB signaling; translesion synthesis; negative regulation of type I interferon production; innate immune response; viral process; response to estrogen; response to vitamin D; protein deubiquitination; ubiquitin-dependent ERAD pathway; cellular response to leukemia inhibitory factor; ubiquitin-dependent protein catabolic process; regulation of viral entry into host cell
Sources:Amigo / QuickGO
Orthologs
Databases	NCBI: entry; OMA: entry
Species	Human	Mouse
Entrez	7706	217069
Ensembl	ENSG00000121060	ENSMUSG00000000275
UniProt	Q14258	Q61510
RefSeq (mRNA)	NM_005082	NM_009546
RefSeq (protein)	NP_005073	NP_033572
Location (UCSC)	Chr 17: 56.84 – 56.91 Mb	Chr 11: 88.89 – 88.91 Mb
PubMed search
- Wikidata
View/Edit Human	View/Edit Mouse

Tripartite motif-containing protein 25 is a protein that in humans is encoded by the TRIM25 gene.

The protein encoded by this gene is a member of the tripartite motif (TRIM) family grouping more than 70 TRIMs. TRIM proteins primarily function as ubiquitin ligases that regulate the innate response to infection. TRIM25 localizes to the cytoplasm. The presence of potential DNA-binding and dimerization-transactivation domains suggests that this protein may act as a transcription factor, similar to several other members of the TRIM family. Expression of the gene is upregulated in response to estrogen, and it is thought to mediate estrogen actions in breast cancer as a primary response gene.

== Structure ==
TRIM25 has an N-terminal RING domain, followed by a B-box type 1 domain, a B-box type 2 domain, a coiled-coil domain (CCD) and a C-terminal SPRY domain. The RING domain coordinates two zinc atoms and is essential for recruiting ubiquitin-conjugating enzymes. The function of the B-box domains is unknown. The CCD domain has been implicated in multimerization and other protein-protein interactions. The SPRY domain is required for substrate recruitment. The NMR chemical shifts for backbone of the PRYSPRY domain of TRIM25 is assigned based on triple-resonance experiments using uniformly isotopic labeled protein and the secondary structure of the domain PRYSPRY domain of TRIM25 predicted based on the NMR assignments.

== Function ==
TRIM25 plays a key role in the RIG-I signaling pathway. RIG-I is a cytosolic pattern recognition receptor that senses viral RNA. Following RNA recognition, the caspase recruitment domain (CARD) of RIG-I undergoes K(63)-linked ubiquitination by TRIM25. The RING and SPRY domains of TRIM25 mediate its interaction with RIG-I. IFN production then follows by an intracellular signaling pathway involving IRF3. Results obtained in human TRIM25 knock-out cells suggest that it may not play a key role in RIG-I activation. These studies revealed that another E3 ubiquitin ligase RIPLET (RNF135), not TRIM25, is sufficient to ubiquitinate and activate the RIG-I.

TRIM25 has been shown to be an RNA-binding protein. TRIM25 binds RNAs (either single- or double-stranded) through an RNA-binding domain (RBD) residing in its C-terminal PRY/SPRY region in conjunction with CCD. RNA-binding appears to be important for TRIM25 ubiquitin ligase activity. Some data suggest that it can destabilise viral mRNA.

== Viral escape ==
To avoid IFN production, the non structural protein (NS1) of influenza will interact with CCD domain of TRIM25 to block RIG-I ubiquitination. Some studies have shown that a deletion of the CCD domain of TRIM25 prevents the binding of NS1. Without this ubiquitination, there won’t be IFN production.
