= Mitochondria associated membranes =

Cellular structure

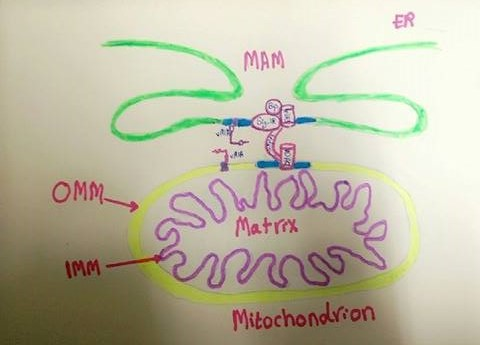
Juxtaposition between endoplasmic reticulum (ER) and mitochondria via MAM

Mitochondria associated membranes (MAMs) represent regions of the endoplasmic reticulum (ER) which are reversibly tethered to mitochondria. These membranes are involved in import of certain lipids from the ER to mitochondria and in regulation of calcium homeostasis, mitochondrial function, autophagy and apoptosis. They also play a role in development of neurodegenerative diseases and glucose homeostasis.

== Role ==
In mammalian cells, formation of these linkage sites are important for some cellular events including:

=== Calcium homeostasis ===
Mitochondria associated membranes are involved in the transport of calcium from the ER to mitochondria. This interaction is important for rapid uptake of calcium by mitochondria through Voltage dependent anion channels (VDACs), which are located at the outer mitochondrial membrane (OMM). This transport is regulated with chaperones and regulatory proteins which control the formation of the ER–mitochondria junction. Transfer of calcium from ER to mitochondria depends on high concentration of calcium in the intermembrane space, and mitochondrial calcium uniporter (MCU) accumulates calcium into the mitochondrial matrix for electrochemical gradient.

=== Regulation of lipid metabolism ===
Transport of phosphatidylserine into mitochondria from the ER for decarboxylation to phosphatidylethanolamine through the ER-mitochondria lipid which transform phosphatidic acid (PA) into phosphatidylserine (PS) by phosphatidylserine synthases 1 and 2 (PSS1, PSS2) in the ER and then transfers PS to mitochondria, where phosphatidylserine decarboxylase (PSD) transform into phosphatidylethanolamine (PE). PE which is synthesized at mitochondria goes back to ER where phosphatidylethanolamine methyltransferase 2 (PEMT2) synthesizes PC (phosphatidylcholine).

=== Regulation of autophagy and mitophagy ===
The formation of autophagosomes through the coordination of ATG (autophagy-related) proteins and the vesicular trafficking by MAM.

=== Regulation of the morphology: Dynamics and functions of mitochondria, and cell survival ===
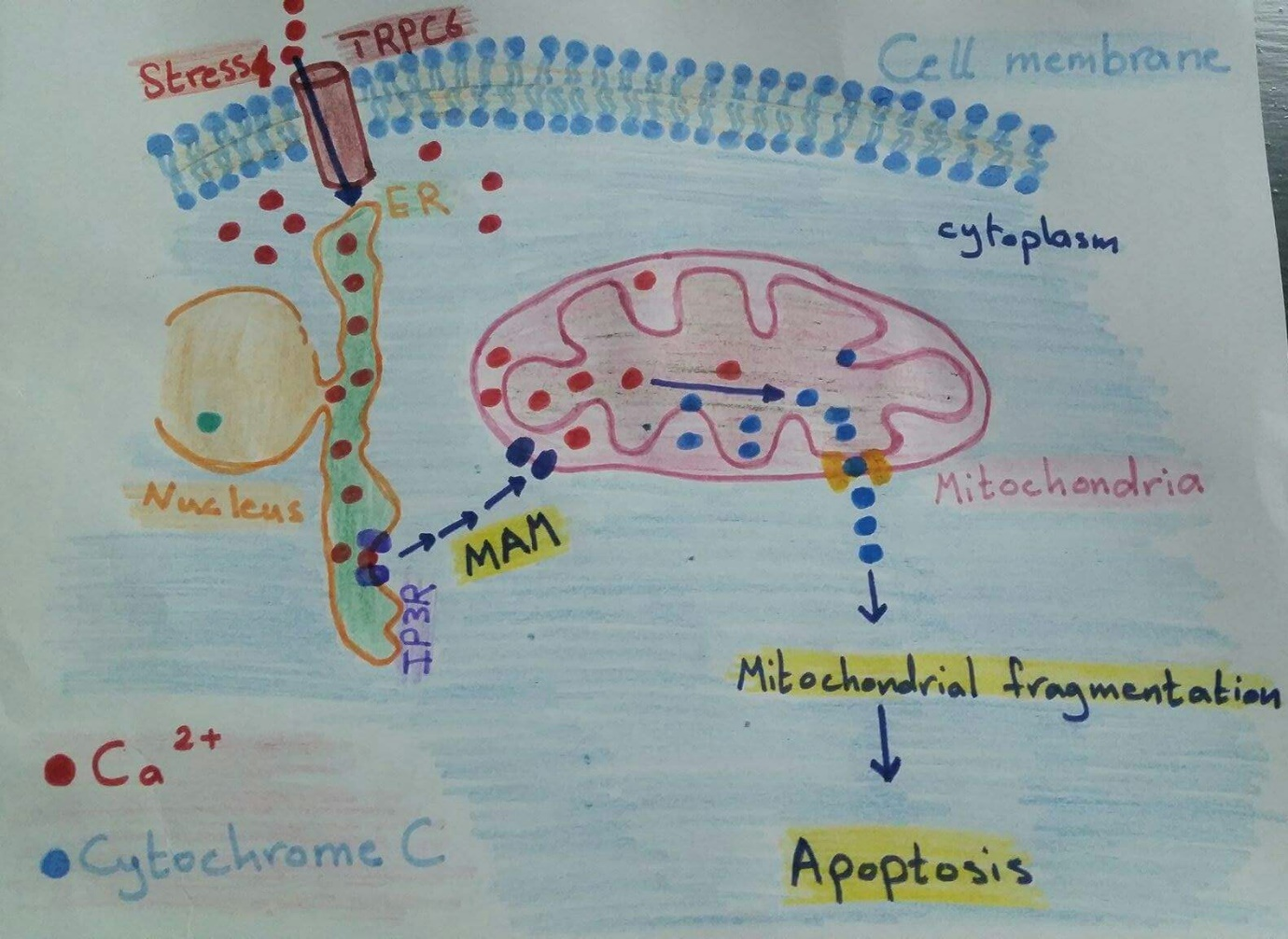
Models of the role of contacts between mitochondria and ER in apoptosis

These membrane contact sites have been associated with the delicate balance between life and death of the cell. Isolation membranes are the initial step to form auto-phagosomes. These closed membranes are double membrane-bond, with lysosomes inside it. The main function of these membrane is degradation, as role in cellular homeostasis. However, the origin of them has remained unclear. Maybe it is the plasma membrane, the endoplasmic reticulum (ER) and the mitochondria. But the ER- mitochondria contact site have markers, the auto-phagosome marker ATG14, and the auto-phagosome-formation marker ATG5, until the formation of auto-phagosome is complete. Whereas, the absence of ATG14 puncta, it is caused by the breakdown of the ER–mitochondria contact site The oxidative stress and the beginning of endoplasmic reticulum (ER) stress occur together; the ER stress have a key sensor enriched at the mitochondria-associated ER membranes (MAMs). This key is PERK (RNA-dependent protein kinase (PKR)-like ER kinase), PERK contributes to apoptosis twofold by sustaining the levels of pro-apoptotic C/EBP homologous protein (CHOP). A tight ER–mitochondria contact site is integral to the mechanisms controlling cellular apoptosis and to inter-organelle Ca^{2+} signals. The mitochondria-associated ER membranes (MAMs), play role in cell death modulation. Mitochondrial outer membrane permeabilization (MOMP), is a reason of the higher matrix Ca^{2+} levels, which is acts as a trigger for apoptosis. MOMP is the process before apoptosis, which is accompanied to permeability of the inner membrane of the mitochondria (IMM). Permeability transition pore (PTP) opening induces mitochondrial swelling and outer membrane of the mitochondria (OMM) rupture. Moreover, PTP opening induce releasing of caspase-activating factors and apoptosis. Caspase-activating factors induced by cytochrome C to bind to the IP3R, this will result in higher Ca^{2+} transfer from the ER to the mitochondria, amplifying the apoptotic signal.

=== Alzheimer’s disease (AD) ===
MAMS play an important role in Ca^{2+} Homeostasis, phospholipid and cholesterol metabolism. Research has associated the alteration of these functions of MAMs in Alzheimer's disease. Mitochindrial associated membranes associated with Alzheimer's disease have been reported to have an up-regulation of lipids synthesized in the MAMs juxtaposition and an up regulation of protein complexes present in the contact region between the ER and mitochondria. Research has suggested that the sites of MAM are the primary sites of activity for γ-secretase activity and amyloid precursor protein (APP) localization along with the presenilin 1 (PS1), presenilin 2 (PS2) proteins. γ-secretase functions in the cleavage of the beta- APP protein. Patients diagnosed with Alzheimer’s disease have presented results that indicated the accumulation of amyloid beta peptide in the brain which in turn leads to the amyloid cascade suggestion. Also increased connectivity between the ER and the mitochondria at MAM sites has been observed in human patients diagnosed with familial AD (FAD) by increase of the contact sites. These individuals showed mutations in the PS1, PS2 and APP proteins at the MAM sites. This increased connectivity also caused an abnormality in Ca^{2+} signaling between neurons. Also with regard to the role in MAMs in phospholipid metabolism, patients diagnosed with AD have been reported to show alterations in levels of Phosphatedylserine and phostphatedylethanolamine in the ER and mitochondria respectively, this leads to the intracellular tangles containing hyperphosphorylated forms of the microtubule‐associated protein tau within tissues.

=== Parkinson's disease (PD) ===
One of the causes of Parkinson's disease is mutations in genes encoding for different proteins that are localized at the MAM sites. Mutations in the genes that encode the proteins Parkin, PINK1, alpha-Synuclein (α-Syn) or the protein deglycase DJ-1 have been linked to this disease through research. However, further research is still being considered in order to determine the direct correlations of these genes to Parkinson’s disease. In normal conditions, these genes are believed to be responsible for the cells ability to degrade mitochondria that has been rendered nonfunctional in a process known as mitophagy. However, mutations in the Parkin and pink1 genes have been associated with the cells becoming incapable of degrading faulty mitochondria. The proteins alpha-Synuclein (α-Syn) and DJ-1 have been shown to promote MAM function interaction between the ER and the mitochondria. The wild-type gene that codes for α-Syn promotes the physical junction between ER and mitochondria by binding to the lipid raft regions of the MAM. However, the mutant form of this gene has a low affinity to the lipid raft regions, thereby diminishing the contact between the ER and mitochondria and causing accumulation of α-Syn in Lewy bodies which is a major characteristic of PD. Further research on PD association with alterations in MAM is still being developed.
