= John F. Holt =

Pioneer in the field of pediatric radiology

John Floyd Holt (January 20, 1915 in Pittsburgh, Pennsylvania – July 22, 1996) was a pioneer in the field of pediatric radiology. He was considered a "radiologic authority on neurofibromatosis, or Recklinghausen disease."

== Education ==
In 1938, Holt completed the six-year B.S. and medical degree program at the University of Pittsburgh and the next year, went to the University of Michigan for his residency.

== Career ==
Holt was the first director of pediatric radiology at C.S. Mott Children's Hospital.

== Publications ==
Radiology for Medical Students "one of the seminal textbooks of the field". It was first published in 1947. The fourth edition was published in 1965.

== Personal life ==
Holt died in his sleep, at his home in Ann Arbor.
