= RIG-I =

Mammalian protein found in humans

RIGI
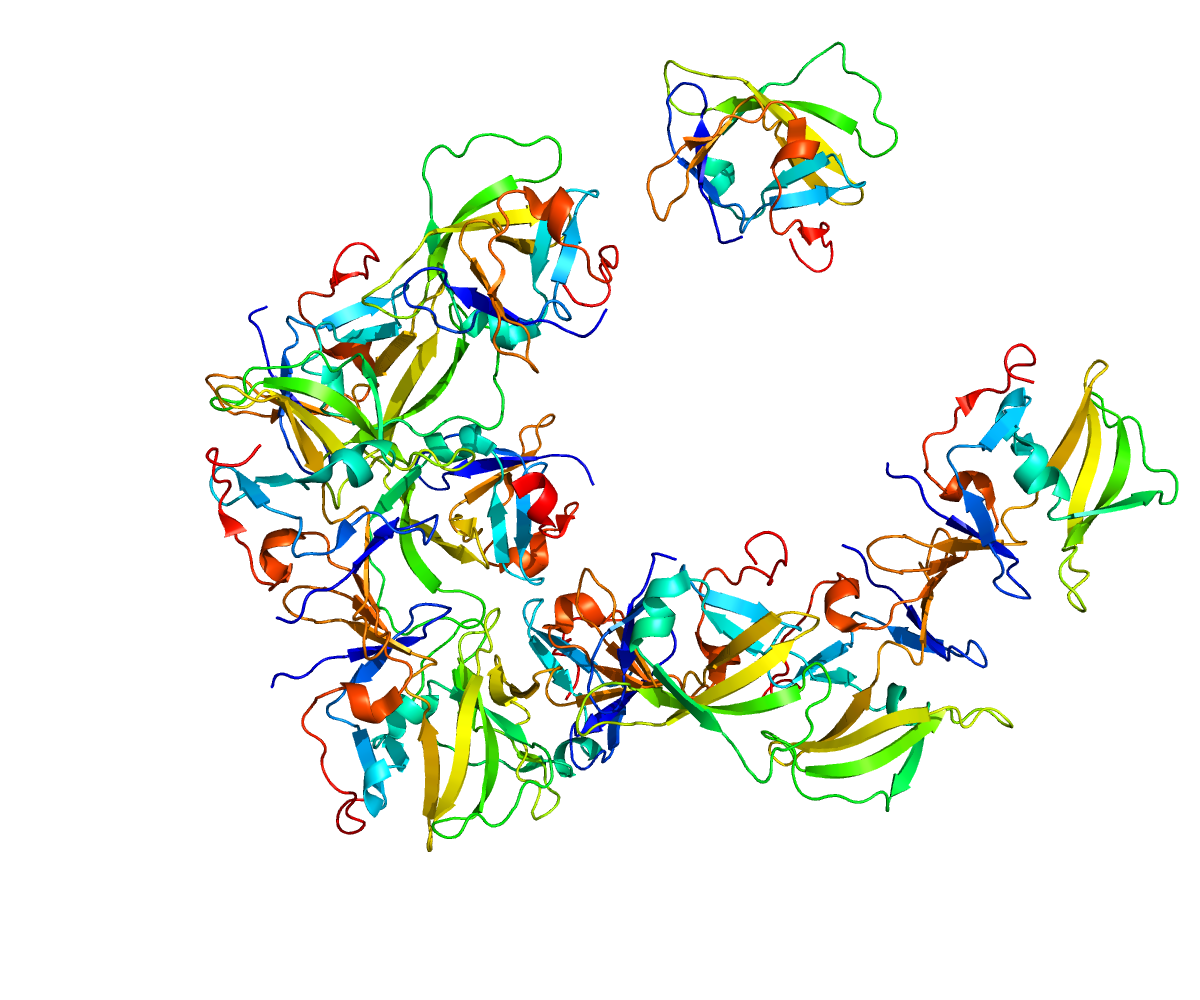

Identifiers
- Aliases: RIGI, DEAD (Asp-Glu-Ala-Asp) box polypeptide 58, RLR-1, SGMRT2, RIG-I, DEXD/H-box helicase 58, RIG1, DDX58, RNA sensor RIG-I
- External IDs: OMIM: 609631; MGI: 2442858; GeneCards: RIGI
Available structures
PDB	Ortholog search: PDBe RCSB
PDB	List of PDB id codes 2LWD, 2LWE, 2QFB, 2QFD, 2RMJ, 2YKG, 3LRN, 3LRR, 3NCU, 3OG8, 3ZD6, 3ZD7, 4AY2, 4BPB, 4NQK, 4ON9, 4P4H, 5E3H, 5F98, 5F9F, 5F9H
Enzyme activity
EC #	BRENDA	ExPASy	KEGG	MetaCyc
3.6.4.13	↗	↗	↗	↗

Gene location (Human)
Chr.	Chromosome 9 (human)
Band	9p21.1	Start	32,455,302 bp
Band	9p21.1	End	32,526,208 bp

Gene location (Mouse)
Chr.	Chromosome 4 (mouse)
Band	4|4 A5	Start	40,203,773 bp
Band	4|4 A5	End	40,239,828 bp
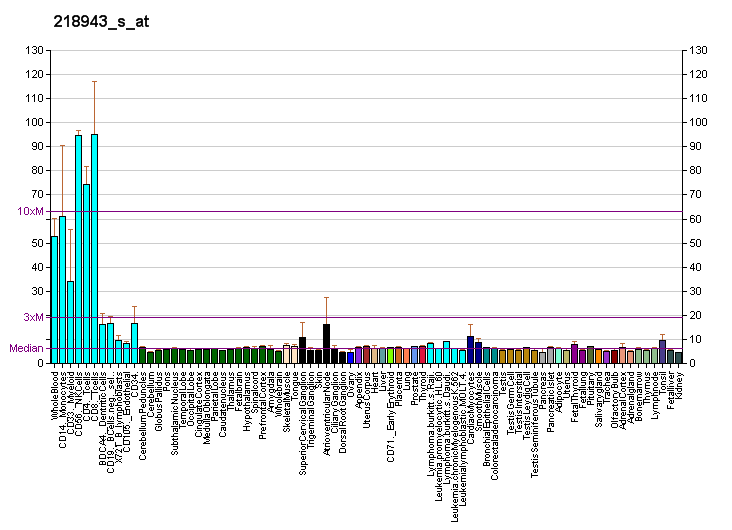
RNA expression pattern
Bgee	Human / Mouse (ortholog); Top expressed in: buccal mucosa cell; skin of thigh; tendon of biceps brachii; white blood cell; monocyte; blood; Achilles tendon; granulocyte; internal globus pallidus; superficial temporal artery / Top expressed in: granulocyte; mesenteric lymph nodes; lumbar spinal ganglion; otolith organ; utricle; jejunum; spleen; calvaria; epithelium of small intestine; zygote; More reference expression data
BioGPS	More reference expression data
Gene ontology
Molecular function	nucleotide binding; helicase activity; zinc ion binding; metal ion binding; protein binding; single-stranded RNA binding; identical protein binding; RNA binding; double-stranded RNA binding; double-stranded DNA binding; hydrolase activity; ATP binding; nucleic acid binding; ubiquitin protein ligase binding
Cellular component	cytoplasm; cell projection; membrane; bicellular tight junction; plasma membrane; ruffle membrane; cell junction; actin cytoskeleton; cytoskeleton; cytosol
Biological process	regulation of cell migration; response to exogenous dsRNA; positive regulation of interferon-alpha production; immune system process; response to virus; cytoplasmic pattern recognition receptor signaling pathway in response to virus; positive regulation of gene expression; positive regulation of granulocyte macrophage colony-stimulating factor production; positive regulation of interleukin-8 production; positive regulation of interleukin-6 production; negative regulation of type I interferon production; detection of virus; viral process; innate immune response; positive regulation of transcription by RNA polymerase II; RIG-I signaling pathway; regulation of type III interferon production; positive regulation of defense response to virus by host; positive regulation of interferon-beta production; protein deubiquitination; positive regulation of response to cytokine stimulus; cellular response to exogenous dsRNA; defense response to virus; positive regulation of DNA-binding transcription factor activity; positive regulation of myeloid dendritic cell cytokine production
Sources:Amigo / QuickGO
Orthologs
Databases	NCBI: entry; OMA: entry
Species	Human	Mouse
Entrez	23586	230073
Ensembl	ENSG00000107201	ENSMUSG00000040296
UniProt	O95786	Q6Q899
RefSeq (mRNA)	NM_014314	NM_172689
RefSeq (protein)	NP_055129	NP_766277
Location (UCSC)	Chr 9: 32.46 – 32.53 Mb	Chr 4: 40.2 – 40.24 Mb
PubMed search
- Wikidata
View/Edit Human	View/Edit Mouse

RIG-I (retinoic acid-inducible gene I), encoded by the gene DDX58 (DEAD box polypeptide 58), is a cytosolic pattern recognition receptor (PRR) that can mediate induction of a type-I interferon (IFN1) response. RIG-I is an essential molecule in the innate immune system for recognizing cells that have been infected with a virus, including but not limited to West Nile virus, Japanese Encephalitis virus, influenza A, Sendai virus, flavivirus, and coronaviruses.

RIG-I is an ATP-dependent DExD/H box RNA helicase activated by specific types of RNA. RIG-I recognizes short double-stranded RNA (dsRNA) in the cytosol with a 5' tri- or di-phosphate end (ppN, pppN) or a 5' 7-methyl guanosine (m7G) cap (cap-0) without a ribose 2′-O-methyl modification at the next unit (cap-0). Such RNAs are often generated during a viral infection but can also be host-derived. For example, RIG-I also plays a role in cancer microenvironments.

Once activated by the dsRNA, RIG-I interacts with MAVS via CARD domains to activate the signaling pathway for IFN1. IFN1s have three main functions: to limit the virus from spreading to nearby cells, promote an innate immune response, including inflammatory responses, and help activate the adaptive immune system.

RIG-I is expressed in most cells, including various innate immune system cells, and is usually in an inactive state. RIG-I orthologs are found in mammals, geese, ducks, some fish, and some reptiles. Knockout mice that have been designed to have a deleted or non-functioning RIG-I gene are not healthy and typically die embryonically. If they survive, the mice have serious developmental dysfunction.

== Structure ==
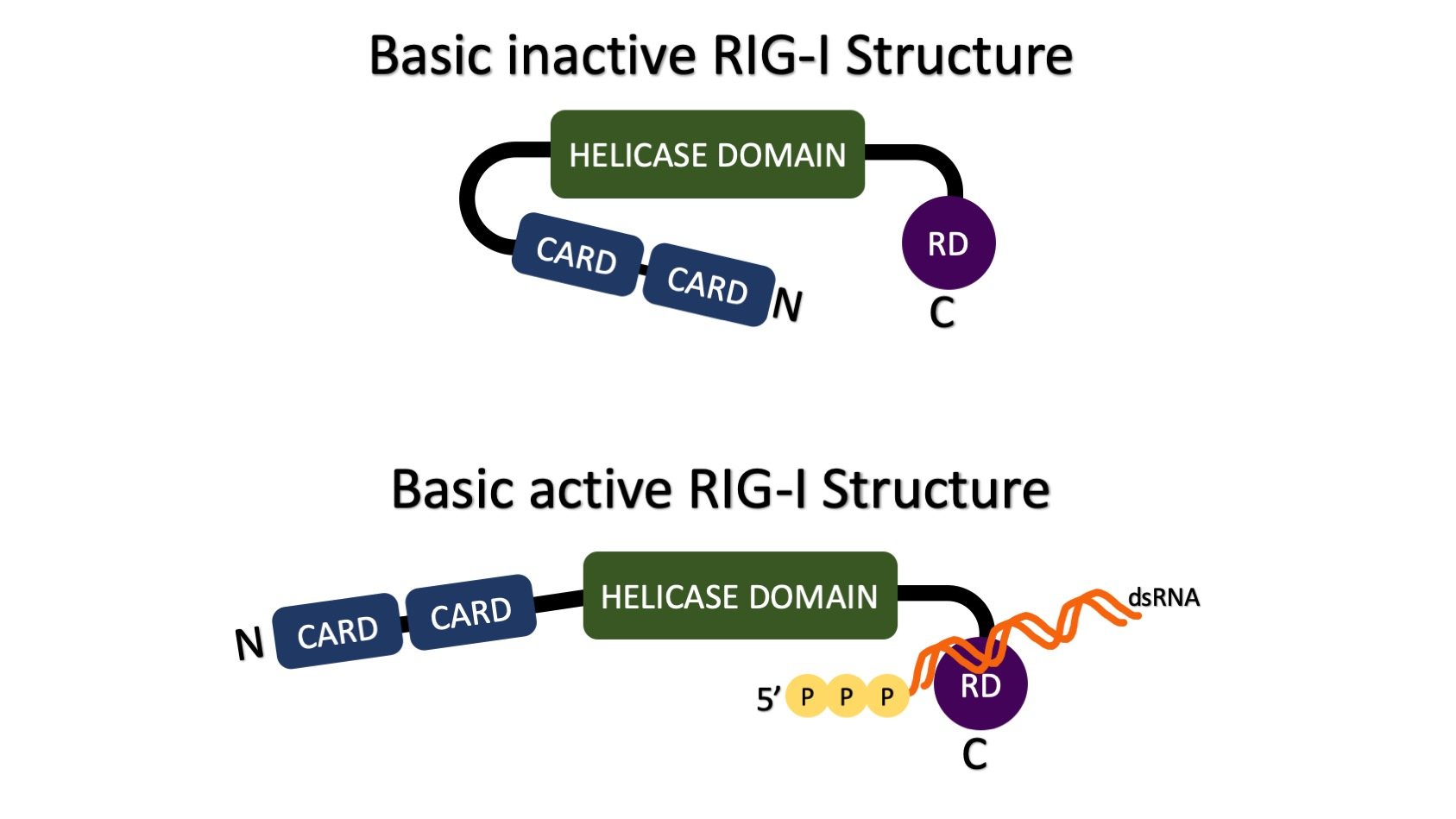
This image shows the basic structure of RIG-I while it is inactive and active. Shown are the N-terminus CARDs, the DExD/H helicase domain, and the C-terminus repressor domain (RD). Included on the active structure is the most common RIG-I PAMP, dsRNA with a 5' triphosphate (5'ppp).

RIG-I is encoded by the DDX58 gene in humans. RIG-I is a helical ATP-dependent DExD/H box RNA helicase with a repressor domain (RD) on the C-terminus that binds to the target RNA. On the N-terminus are two caspase activation and recruitment domains (CARDs) that are important for interactions with mitochondrial antiviral signaling protein (MAVS).

RIG-I is a member of the RIG-I like receptors (RLRs) that also includes Melanoma Differentiation-Associated protein 5 (MDA5) and Laboratory of genetics physiology 2 (LGP2). RIG-I and MDA5 are both involved in activating MAVS and triggering an antiviral response.

== Mechanism ==
RIG-I distinguishes between (suspected) viral vs host RNA by a simultaneous presence of 5' pp/ppp (di/tri-phosphate) and absence of 2'-O-methyl on the first nucleotide. It tolerates the presence of m7G but does not make much contact with it. On binding to non-target RNA, the motor domain of the helicase stays folded to facilitate quick release. On binding to target RNA, the domain unfolds to clamp onto the RNA.

RIG-I also binds some non-double-stranded RNA such as the template-loop in "mini viral RNA" (mvRNA) produced by noncanonical/aberrant transcription of the influenza A virus genome. Less is known about how it achieves the binding.

RIG-I activates the IFN1 system by having its CARD domains bind with the CARD domains of MAVS.

== Regulation ==
For many viruses, effective RIG-I-mediated antiviral responses are dependent on functionally active LGP2.

The stimulator of interferon genes STING antagonizes RIG-I by binding its N-terminus, probably as to avoid overactivation of RIG-I signaling and the associated autoimmunity.

== Function ==
RIG-I works as a pattern recognition receptor. PRRs are a part of the innate immune system, mainly used for recognizing invaders. In a viral infection, a virus enters a cell, and it takes over the cell's machinery to self replicate. Once a virus has begun replication, the infected cell is no longer useful and potentially harmful to its host, and the host's immune system must be notified. RIG-I functions as a pattern recognition receptor and PRR's are the molecules that start the notification process. PRRs recognize specific pathogen-associated molecular patterns (PAMP). Once the PAMP is recognized, it can then lead to a signaling cascade producing an inflammatory response or an interferon response. PRRs are located in many different cell types, however most notably active in the innate immune system cells. In addition, they are located in many different parts of those cells, such as the cell membrane, endosomal membrane, and in the cytosol, to provide the most protection against many types of invaders (i.e., extracellular and intracellular microbes).

RIG-I specifically resides in the cytosol and activates the type-I interferon response.

=== Ligands ===
The PAMP recognized by RIG-I are ideally short (<300 base pairs) dsRNA with either 5' triphosphate end or a 5' 7-methyl guanosine (m7G) cap, without a ribose 2′-O-methyl modification at the next unit (pppN and cap-0). It also recognizes 5' diphosphate (ppN) with lower efficacy, which is also used by some viruses. As mentioned above, RIG-I also binds some non-dsRNA such as flu-A mvRNA.

Cells are synthesizing multiple types of RNA at all times, so it is important that RIG-I is not going to bind to those RNAs. Native RNA from inside the cell contains an N_{1} 2'O-Methyl self RNA marker that deters RIG-I from binding.

The ligands of RIG-I are still being investigated and are controversial. RIG-I works together with other dsRNA sensors such as MDA5, which complicates the characterization. In vivo, just RIG-I may not create a significant enough response.

==== Non-self ====
In most natural settings, RIG-I ligands appear in a cell because there is an invader. This can include:

- Viral dsRNA. Because viruses often use a different 5' capping mechanism compared to mammals, a lack of a full cap may indicate a foreign origin. The dsRNA can come from single-stranded RNA (ssRNA) viruses or from dsRNA viruses. The ssRNA viruses are not typically recognized as ssRNA, but through intermittent replication products in the form of dsRNA.
- Transcription products of non-self molecules. DNA-dependent RNA polymerase III (Pol III) produces a 5' pppN end when transcribing AT-rich dsDNA. If the result folds into a dsRNA and is of an appropriate size, it can be recognized by RIG-I.

Some viruses have evolved countermeasures to RIG-I. For example, some retroviruses such as HIV-1 encode a protease that directs RIG-I to the lysosome for degradation, and thereby evade RIG-I mediated signaling.

RIG-I PAMPS can also be synthetic in origin. The in vitro transcription reaction used to make mRNA-based drugs and vaccines can produce dsRNA byproducts that activate RIG-I. In vitro transcribed RNAs initiated with 5′-triphosphorylated adenosine generate significantly greater levels of highly immunogenic dsRNAs, compared to their 5′-triphosphorylated guanosine counterparts.

==== Cancer ====
RIG-I also recognizes "self" RNAs, most commonly in the case of cancer, leading to an interferon response. Depending on the type of cancer, this can have either positive or negative effects. For example, in breast cancer cells (BrCa), noncoding RNA leads to RIG-I activation and causes the cells to resist treatments and grow. On the other hand, RIG-I can act as a tumor suppressor in acute myeloid leukemia and hepatocellular carcinoma.

RIG-I may deter cancers caused by oncoviruses by triggering cell death in the affected cell. Cell death can occur via apoptosis via the caspase-3 pathway, or through IFN-dependent T cells and natural killer cells.

=== Type-1 interferon pathway ===
RIG-I is a signaling molecule and is usually in a condensed resting state until it is activated. Once RIG-I is bound to its PAMP, molecules such as PACT and zinc antiviral protein short isoform (ZAPs), help keep RIG-I in an activated state which then keeps the caspase activation and recruitment domains (CARDs) ready for binding. The molecule will migrate to the mitochondrial antiviral signaling protein (MAVS) CARD domain and bind. RIG-I CARD interactions have their own regulatory system. Although RIG-I expresses a CARD at all times, it must be activated by the ligand before it will allow both CARDs to interact with the MAVS CARD. This interaction will start the pathway to making proinflammatory cytokines and type-1 Interferon (IFN1;IFNα and IFNβ), which create an antiviral environment. Once the IFN1s leave the cell, they can bind to IFN1 receptors on the cell surface from which they came from, or other cells close by. This will upregulate the production of more IFN1s, boosting an antiviral environment. IFN1 also activates the JAK-STAT pathway, leading to the production of IFN-stimulated genes (ISGs).

== History ==
In 2000, RIG-I was named by researchers from the Shanghai Institute of Hematology who identified novel genes that respond to all-trans retinoic acid (ATRA) in leukemia cells. RIG-I and the other genes were assigned the temporary name of RIG (retinoic acid–induced gene) in the format of RIG-A, RIG-B etc by the group, however they performed no additional characterization on RIG-I.
